= Hiiumaa =

Second largest island in Estonia

Coordinates: 58°53′03″N 22°38′40″E

Hiiumaa (Dagö)
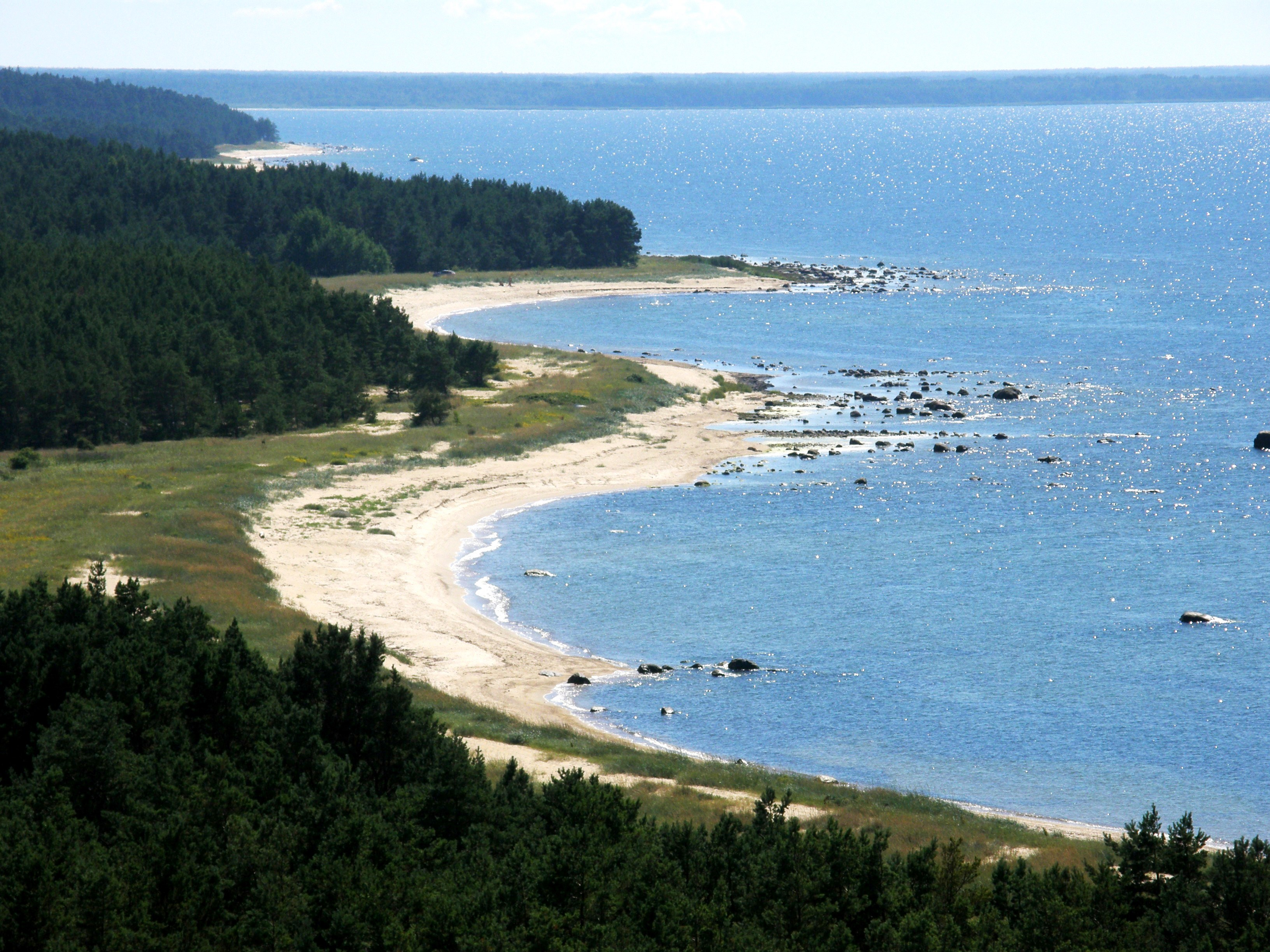
- Tahkuna peninsula is the northernmost part of Hiiumaa

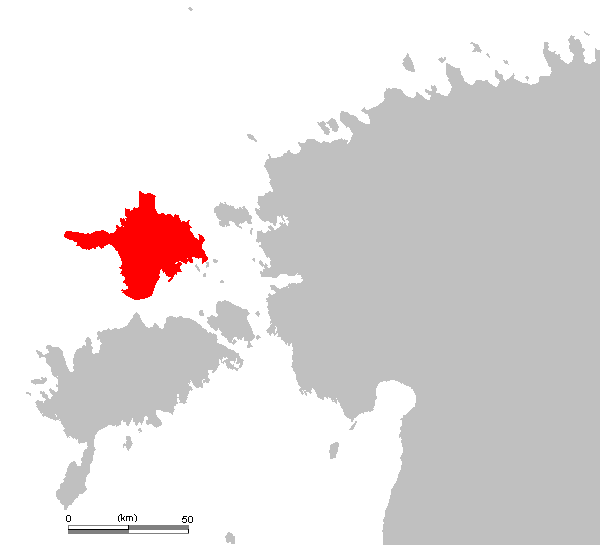

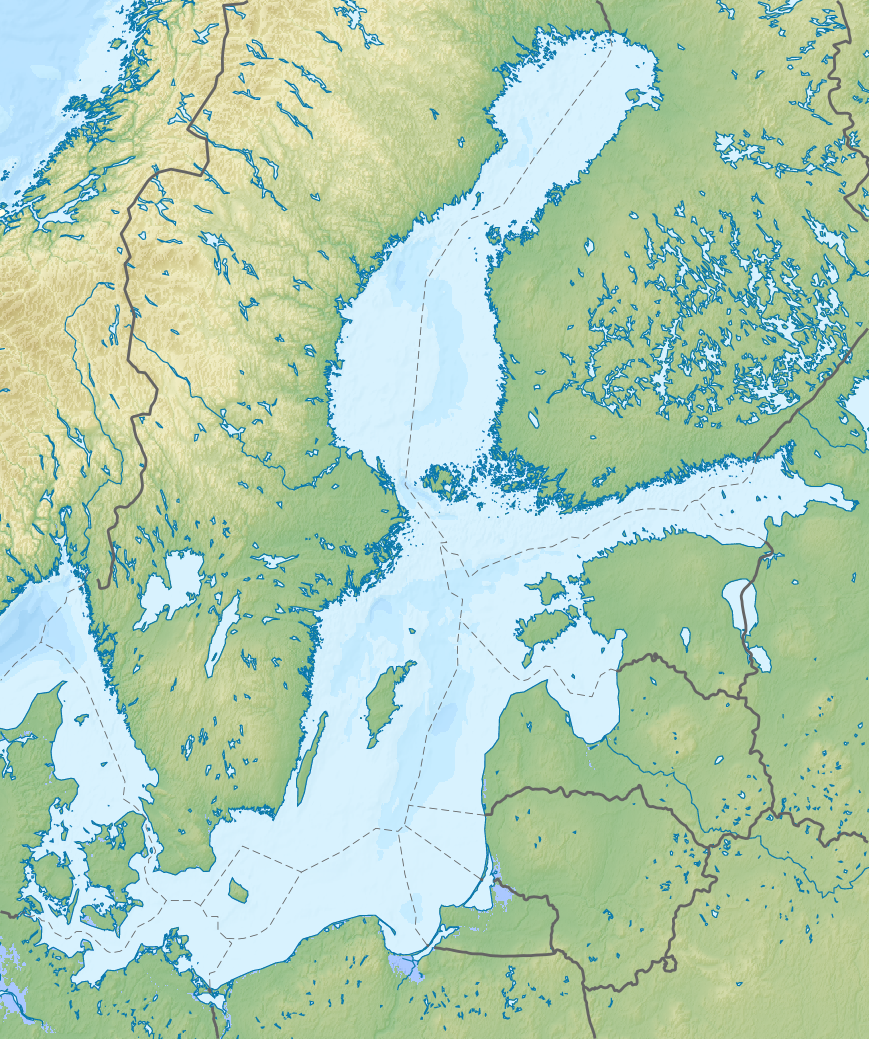
- Location within Europe Location within Baltic Sea region Location within Estonia

Geography
- Location: Baltic Sea
- Archipelago: West Estonian archipelago
- Area: 989 km^{2} (382 sq mi)
- Highest elevation: 68 m (223 ft)
- Highest point: Tornimägi

Administration
- Estonia
- County, parish: Hiiu County, Hiiumaa Parish
- Largest settlement: Kärdla (pop. 3,287 [as of 1 January 2012])

Demographics
- Population: 9,558 (2019)
- Pop. density: 9.1/km^{2} (23.6/sq mi)

Hiiumaa (US: /ˈhiːʊmɑː, ˈhiːəmɑː/ HEE-uum-ah, -ə-mah, Estonian: [ˈhiːumɑː]) is the second largest island in Estonia and is part of the West Estonian archipelago, in the Baltic Sea. It has an area of 989 km^{2} and is 22 km from the Estonian mainland. Its largest town is Kärdla. It is located within Hiiu County.

== Names ==
Administratively Hiiumaa is the "main island" of the Hiiu County, called Hiiumaa or Hiiu maakond in Estonian. The Swedish name of the island is Dagö ('Day' island), Dagden in German, and Dagø in Danish. In modern Finnish, it is called Hiidenmaa, literally 'Hiisi's Land'. In Old Gutnish, it was Dagaiþ ('day isthmus'), from which the local North Germanic name Daë is derived.

== History ==
=== Prehistory ===
Hiiumaa emerged from the Baltic Sea 8500 years ago due to isostatic uplift after the retreat of the ice cap. Mesolithic settlements are found on the island's Kõpu Peninsula from about 5500 BC. These settlements seem to be related mostly to seal hunting and extended into the Neolithic period.

As Hiiumaa is constantly uplifting the local sea level was 20 meters higher than today at this time. For this reason these settlements are located far from the modern coastline. The pottery found at these sites is of the Narva Type and is similar to that found on Saaremaa and the Estonian mainland.

A series of stone-cist graves are also present on the island from the Late Bronze Age through to the Late Iron Age.

=== Crusades ===
The first documented record of the island was as Dageida in 1228, when Hiiumaa and the rest of Estonia were conquered by Germanic crusaders. In 1254, Hiiumaa was divided between the Bishopric of Ösel-Wiek and the Livonian branch of the Teutonic Order, acting partly on behalf of the Hanseatic League.

=== Swedish and Russian era ===
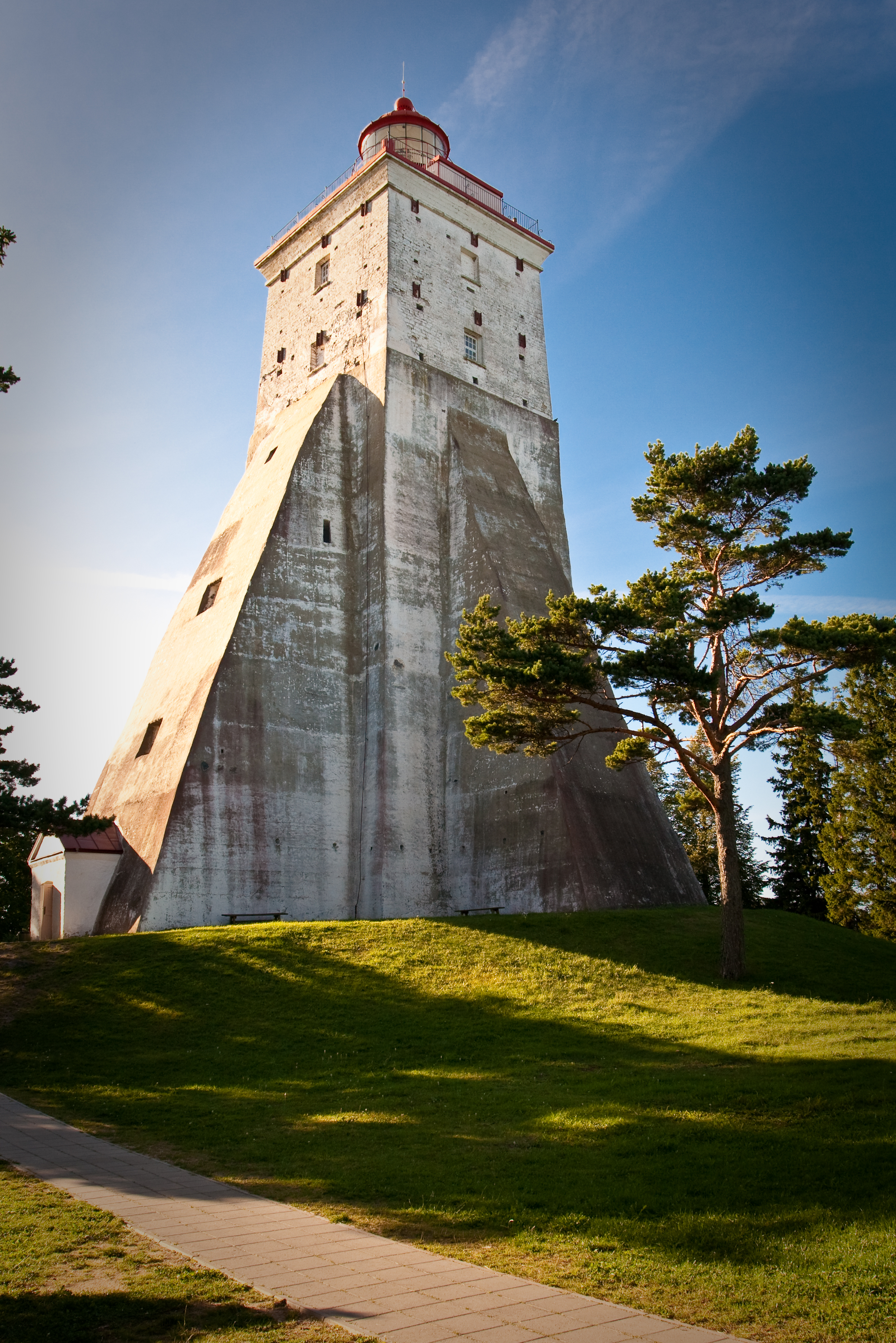
Kõpu Lighthouse in Kõpu, Hiiumaa is one of the island's landmarks.

The island was referred to as Dagö as part of Swedish Estonia. It was a part of Sweden from 1563 to 1721, after which it passed to the Russian Empire as part of the Governorate of Estonia, though Dagö's Swedish population kept most of their privileges. Most of the island's previously numerous Swedish-speaking population emigrated or were "Estonianised" during the period of Imperial Russian rule, although a minority remained until the 20th century. Estonian Swedes are also known as aibofolke ("the island people" in local Swedish) or rannarootslased ("coastal Swedes" in Estonian). Administratively the island of Hiiumaa belonged to Lääne County.

=== World War I ===
Hiiumaa was occupied during World War I by the Imperial German Army, in Operation Albion. After the war, in 1918, it became a part of independent Estonia.

=== World War II ===
The waters near Hiiumaa were active during World War II:

- 23 June 1941: The Soviet destroyer Gnevny was sunk by a German seamine.
- 25 June: the Soviet minesweeper T-208 Shkiv was destroyed by a German seamine.
- 27 June: Two German motor torpedo boats, S43 and S106, were destroyed by Soviet seamines.
- 1 July: the Soviet submarine M-81 was destroyed by a German seamine north of Hiiumaa.
- 7 July: the Soviet minesweeper T-216 was sunk.
- 30 July: the Soviet minesweeper T-201 Zarjad was sunk.
- 10 August: the German submarine U-144 was sunk by a torpedo from the Soviet submarine SC-307.
- Hiiumaa Island was occupied by the Stalinist Soviet Union in 1940, by Nazi Germany in 1941, and by the USSR again in 1944.

=== Soviet occupation ===
During Soviet occupation (1944–1991) Hiiumaa was closed to travel to foreigners as well as to most mainland Estonia. Hiiumaa remained under Soviet control until Estonia regained independence in August 1991. A number of derelict Soviet forts and communication towers, previously used by the Soviet Border Guard in Estonia, are still present on the island's northern coast.

== Natural environment ==
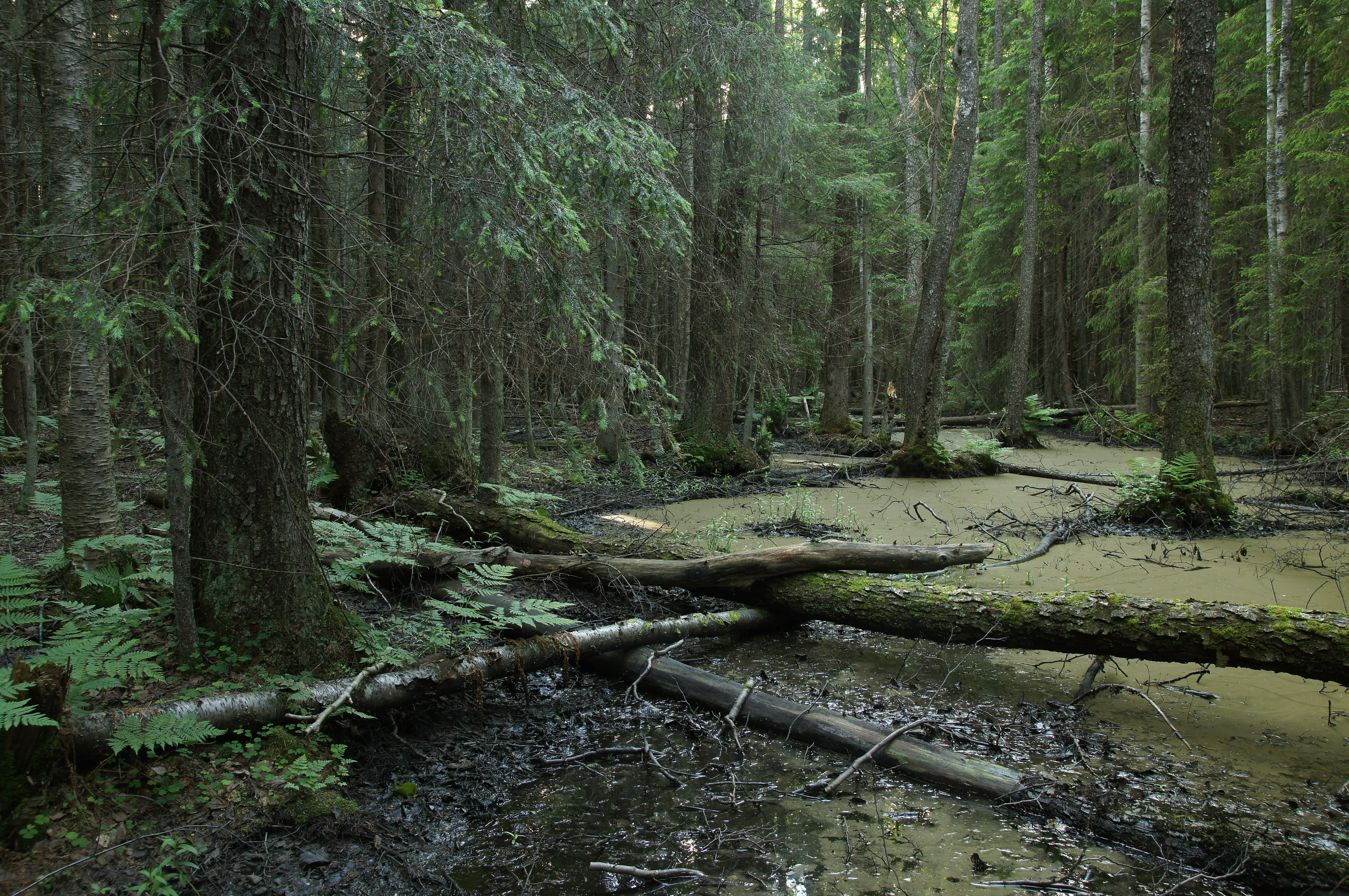
Tahkuna Nature Reserve

Hiiumaa is an island in Estonia located north of Saaremaa in the Baltic Sea. It is the northernmost island in the Muhu archipelago, which includes Saaremaa and Muhu. Hiiumaa has a low relief (up to 68 m above sea level) and is mostly formed of limestone, that is exposed in cliffs around parts of the island's coast. In the north of the island there are a series of fossilized beaches preserved as uplift has occurred. The modern beaches are primarily on the northern and western coast lines. The natural environment is protected within the Tahkuna Nature Reserve and West Estonian Archipelago Biosphere Reserve.

The Hiiu Shoal (Nekmangrund) is located off the northwestern shore of Hiiumaa Island. The Soela Strait separates Hiiumaa from Saaremaa to its south, and the Muhu Strait separates it from the mainland of Estonia.

=== Ecology ===
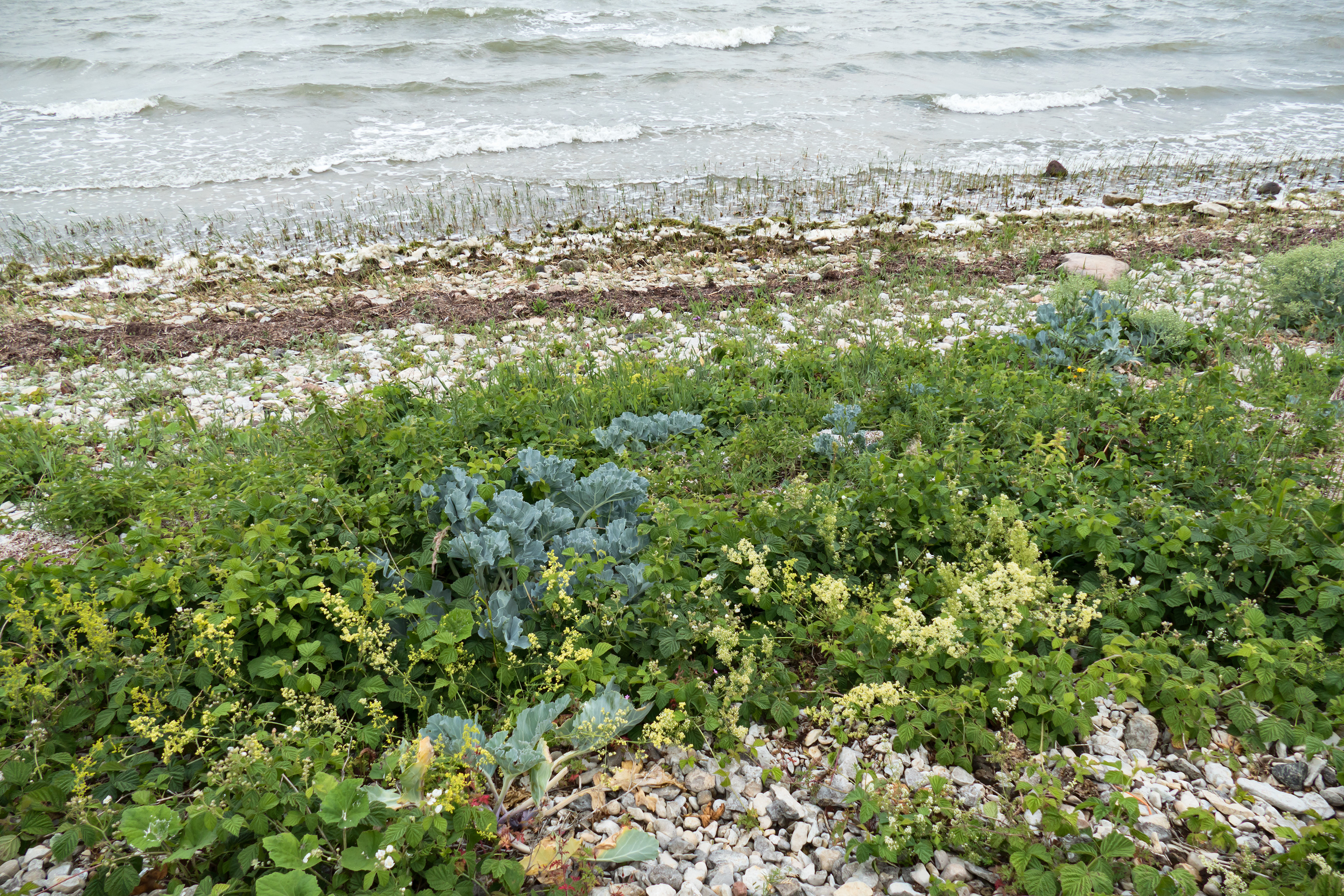
Beach vegetation on Hiiumaa

The fauna and flora of Hiiumaa are similar to the Estonian mainland. The mammal fauna includes elk, red deer, roe deer, wild boars, foxes, lynxes and martens. Wolves and bears have recently started to repopulate the island after being made locally extinct.

Minks were also reintroduced in 2000, after they were exterminated by trappers. Since the end of the 1990s the island shelters a conservation project aimed at restoring populations of European mink, an endangered species of which there is about only 1,000 individual specimens left in Europe as of 2017. This project started with removing from the island all American minks that had escaped from breeding farms, and reintroducing some European minks. The latter started breeding.

The bird species found on the island include black storks, golden eagles, cranes, avocets and swans. The forests are dominated by pine and deciduous trees, the rest of the uncultivated land is covered by swamps and dunes. The island has about 1000 species of large plants of which 50 are protected.

=== Geology ===
The exposed geology of Hiiumaa is composed of Paleozoic limestone which dips towards the South, covered by glacial sediments. In the North of the island the limestones are Ordovician and they young upwards to the Silurian in the South. These limestones formed at 30 degrees South and have since been moving North with the rest of the Estonian block. Bore holes have found Cambrian sedimentary rocks and a crystalline basement.

In the Ordovician (c. 455 million years ago) the sea floor was hit by a meteorite forming the 4 km wide Kärdla impact structure. This structure was then filled with Paleozoic sediment. It located about 4 km west-southwest of Kärdla and is barely visible in the modern geomorphology. The crater is well preserved at depth, with a clear rim, breccia and minerals and rocks formed from the heat and pressure of the impact.

The limestone is overlain by Pleistocene glacial deposits that were deposited as the ice cap retreated 11 to 12 thousand years ago. These include terminal moraines, the two most prominent being one in the South of Island running towards the North-East and another forming the Kõpu Peninsula.

=== Climate ===
Climate data for Hiiumaa (Ristna 1991–2020 normals and extremes 1922–present, western part of Hiiumaa)
Month	Jan	Feb	Mar	Apr	May	Jun	Jul	Aug	Sep	Oct	Nov	Dec	Year
Record high °C (°F)	8.4 (47.1)	7.1 (44.8)	15.0 (59.0)	21.5 (70.7)	27.8 (82.0)	29.4 (84.9)	31.5 (88.7)	31.5 (88.7)	27.0 (80.6)	18.6 (65.5)	13.0 (55.4)	9.6 (49.3)	31.5 (88.7)
Mean daily maximum °C (°F)	1.2 (34.2)	0.3 (32.5)	2.5 (36.5)	7.3 (45.1)	12.6 (54.7)	16.9 (62.4)	20.8 (69.4)	20.3 (68.5)	15.9 (60.6)	10.3 (50.5)	5.8 (42.4)	3.2 (37.8)	9.7 (49.5)
Daily mean °C (°F)	−0.5 (31.1)	−1.6 (29.1)	0.3 (32.5)	4.1 (39.4)	9.0 (48.2)	13.5 (56.3)	17.5 (63.5)	17.3 (63.1)	13.3 (55.9)	8.3 (46.9)	4.2 (39.6)	1.6 (34.9)	7.2 (45.0)
Mean daily minimum °C (°F)	−2.7 (27.1)	−3.7 (25.3)	−2 (28)	1.1 (34.0)	5.6 (42.1)	10.4 (50.7)	14.4 (57.9)	14.2 (57.6)	10.5 (50.9)	5.9 (42.6)	2.3 (36.1)	−0.3 (31.5)	4.6 (40.3)
Record low °C (°F)	−28.4 (−19.1)	−26.9 (−16.4)	−20 (−4)	−11.9 (10.6)	−3.8 (25.2)	−0.6 (30.9)	4.6 (40.3)	1.5 (34.7)	−2.3 (27.9)	−6.9 (19.6)	−15.1 (4.8)	−26.2 (−15.2)	−28.4 (−19.1)
Average precipitation mm (inches)	52 (2.0)	42 (1.7)	35 (1.4)	31 (1.2)	32 (1.3)	50 (2.0)	53 (2.1)	72 (2.8)	60 (2.4)	72 (2.8)	72 (2.8)	58 (2.3)	628 (24.7)
Average precipitation days (≥ 1.0 mm)	11.8	9.4	8.3	6.5	5.9	6.9	6.8	9.2	9.2	12.9	13.0	14.1	114.0
Average relative humidity (%)	86	86	83	81	79	81	80	80	81	83	86	85	83
Mean monthly sunshine hours	28.2	59.3	119.4	190.9	293.1	297.6	303.2	251.0	166.2	96.1	36.3	19.0	1,864.4
Source 1: Estonian Weather Service (sun, 1971-2000)
Source 2: NOAA/NCEI (precipitation day, 1991-2020)

== Towns and buildings ==
The island has several villages, as well a small town of Kärdla (pop. 3,287) and small boroughs of Käina and Kõrgessaare. The oldest surviving church was built in Pühalepa in 1259, though it was rebuilt in the 18th century. The Hanseatic League built a lighthouse in Kõpu near the start of the 16th century. It is the third oldest continuously operating lighthouse in the world.

== Employment and land-use ==
The island's economy is mostly tourism, livestock, farming, fishing, and fish processing. The tourism is mostly seasonal.

Hiiumaa council agrees to the construction of a wind farm. Recently there has been a trend towards smaller farms and more tourism

== Transport ==
Road transport from Estonian mainland to Hiiumaa involves a 75-minute (28 km) ferry crossing from Rohuküla to Heltermaa, which is 25 km by road from Kärdla. There are up to 10 ferry departures a day operated by TS Laevad. In the summer weekends, getting car space on the ferry usually requires advance booking. There are about 2 scheduled buses a day between Tallinn (the capital of Estonia) and Kärdla. In the winter, the island can be reached, conditions permitting, via a 26.5 km ice road (the longest in Europe) across the frozen Baltic Sea. A bridge to the mainland of Estonia has been occasionally proposed.

Hiiumaa is served by Kärdla Airport, with regular flights to Tallinn. Bicycle rental is also available in Kärdla and there is a good bicycle path built from Kärdla towards Kõrgessaare.

== Culture and politics ==
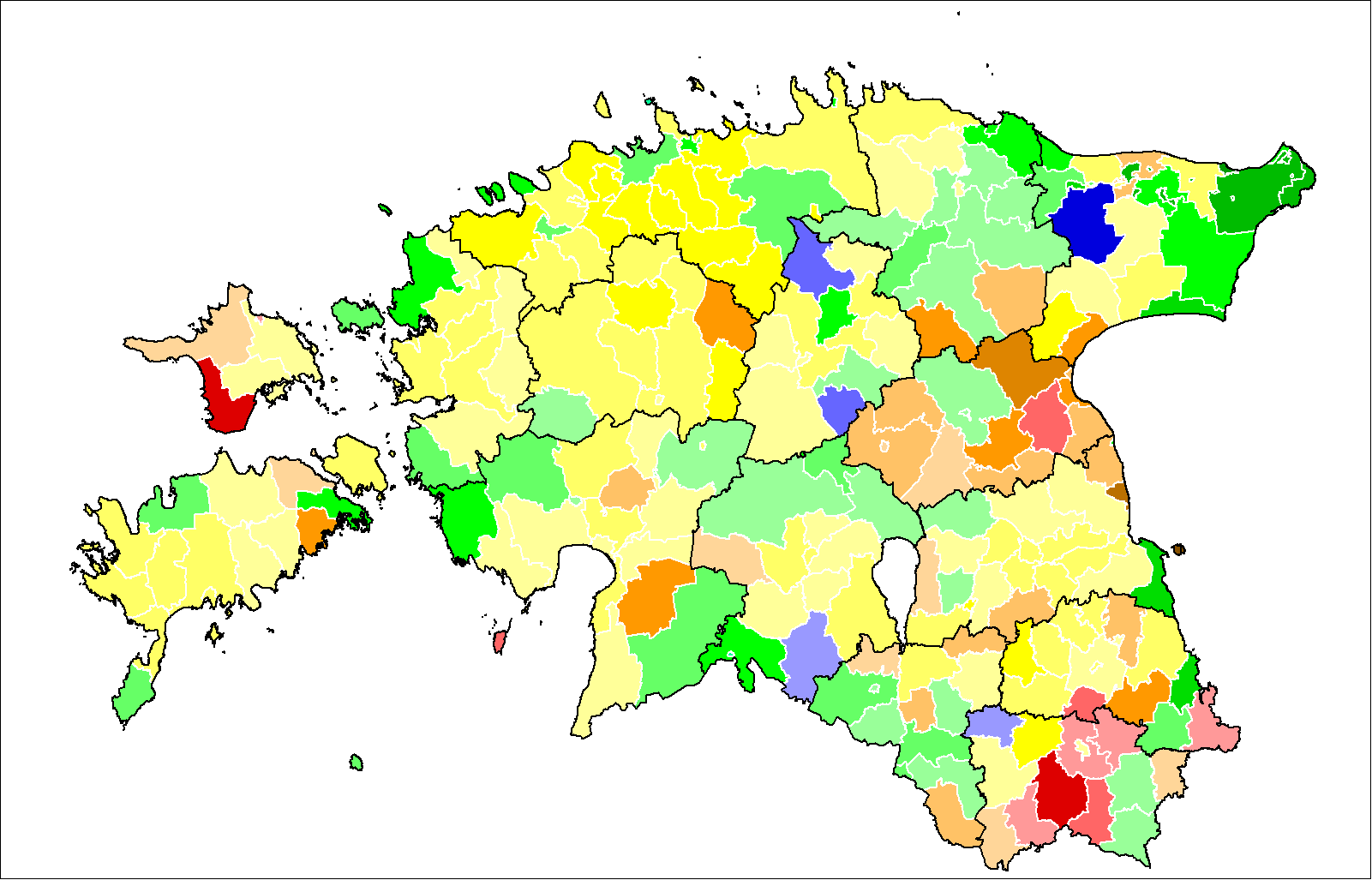
2007 Estonia election. Social Democratic Party (Red), Estonian Reform Party (yellow), Estonian Center Party (green), Union of Pro Patria and Res Publica (Blue), People's Union of Estonia (brown)

The island is part of the B7 Network, a loose grouping of the major islands of the Baltic Sea. Smoked cooked plaice is a traditional summertime delicacy. There is a friendly rivalry with the neighboring island of Saaremaa.

=== Notable people ===
People from Hiiumaa Parish

- Juhan Maaker (1845 in Muda – 1930), Estonian folk musician, plays the Torupill, a bagpipe
- Johannes Haller (1865 in Käina – 1947) a Baltic German medievalist and teacher
- Rudolf Tobias (1873 in Selja – 1918), Estonian composer and an organist
- Roman von Ungern-Sternberg (1885–1921), Russian White military commander in the Russian Civil War, lived locally in summer
- Aleksander Maaker (1890 in Muda – 1968), the last traditional player of the torupill (Estonian bagpipe)
- William von Wirén (1894 in Suuresadama – 1956), a sailor who competed in the 1928 Summer Olympics.
- Ivan Triesault (1898–1980), Estonian-American actor, son of local Baltic German parents
- Herman Sergo (1911 in Jausa – 1989), writer who mainly depicts the life of seafarers and coastal dwellers.
- Ülo Sooster (1924 in Ühtri – 1970), Estonian artist and painter
- Vaino Väljas (1931 in Külaküla – 2024), diplomat and politician; leader of the Communist party in Soviet Estonia, from 1988 to 1991
- Bruno Pao (1931 in Emmaste – 2025), maritime historian, writer and municipal politician.
- Heiki Nabi (born 1985 in Hilleste), Estonian Olympic champion Greco-Roman wrestler at the 2012 Summer Olympics
- Andre Frolov (born 1988 in Emmaste), footballer who played over 650 games and 6 for Estonia

== Image gallery ==
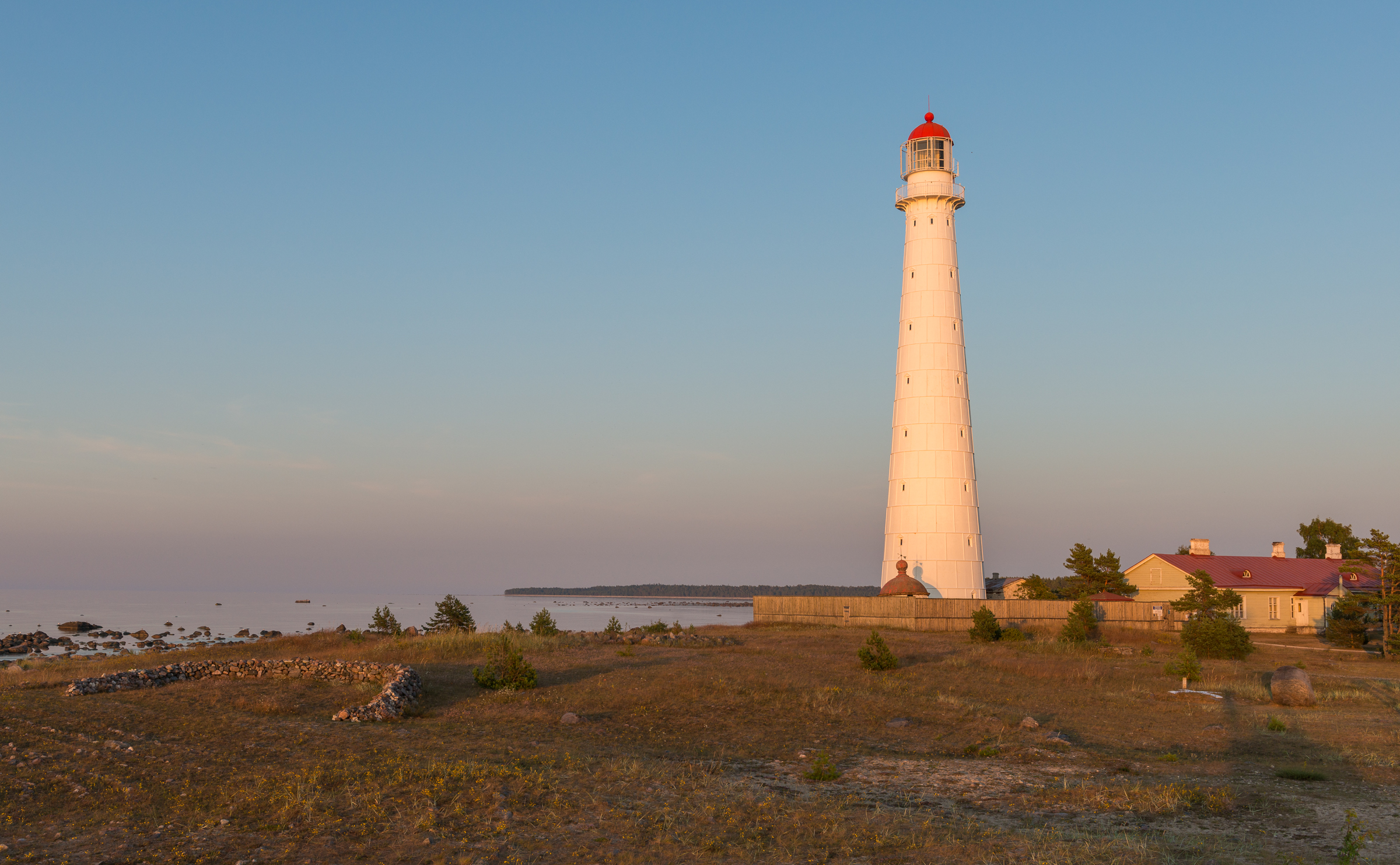
Tahkuna lighthouse

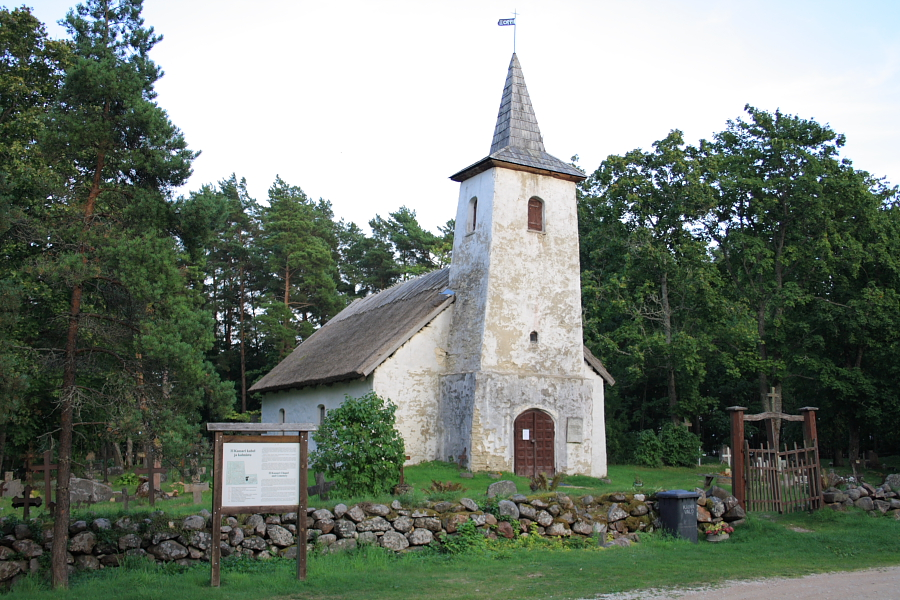
Church of Kassari

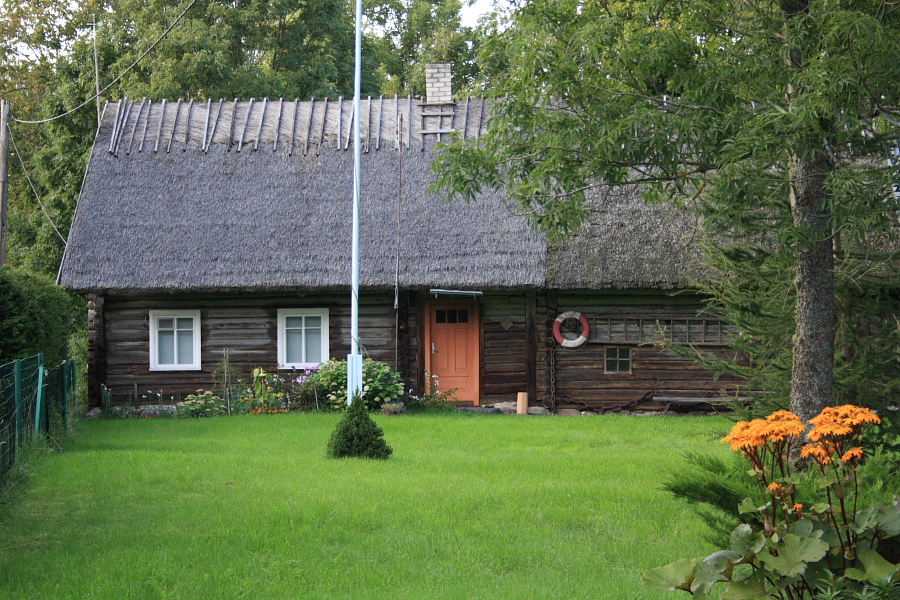
Old farmhouse

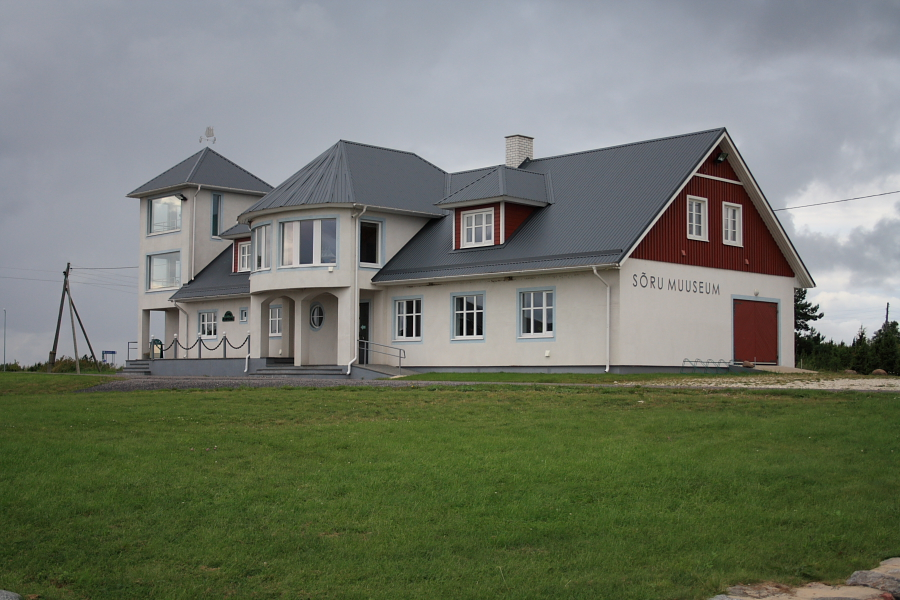
Sõru museum

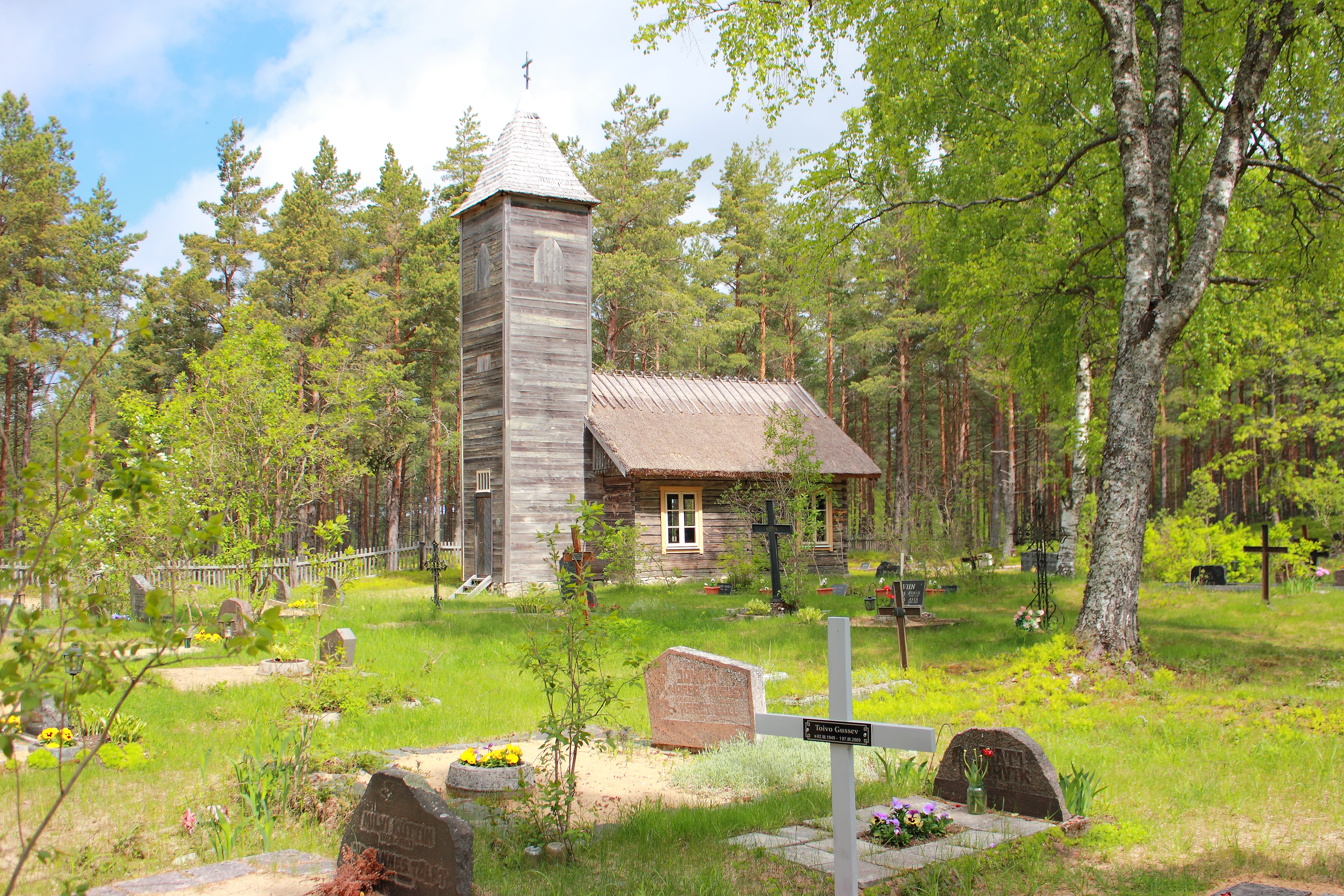
Malvaste chapel

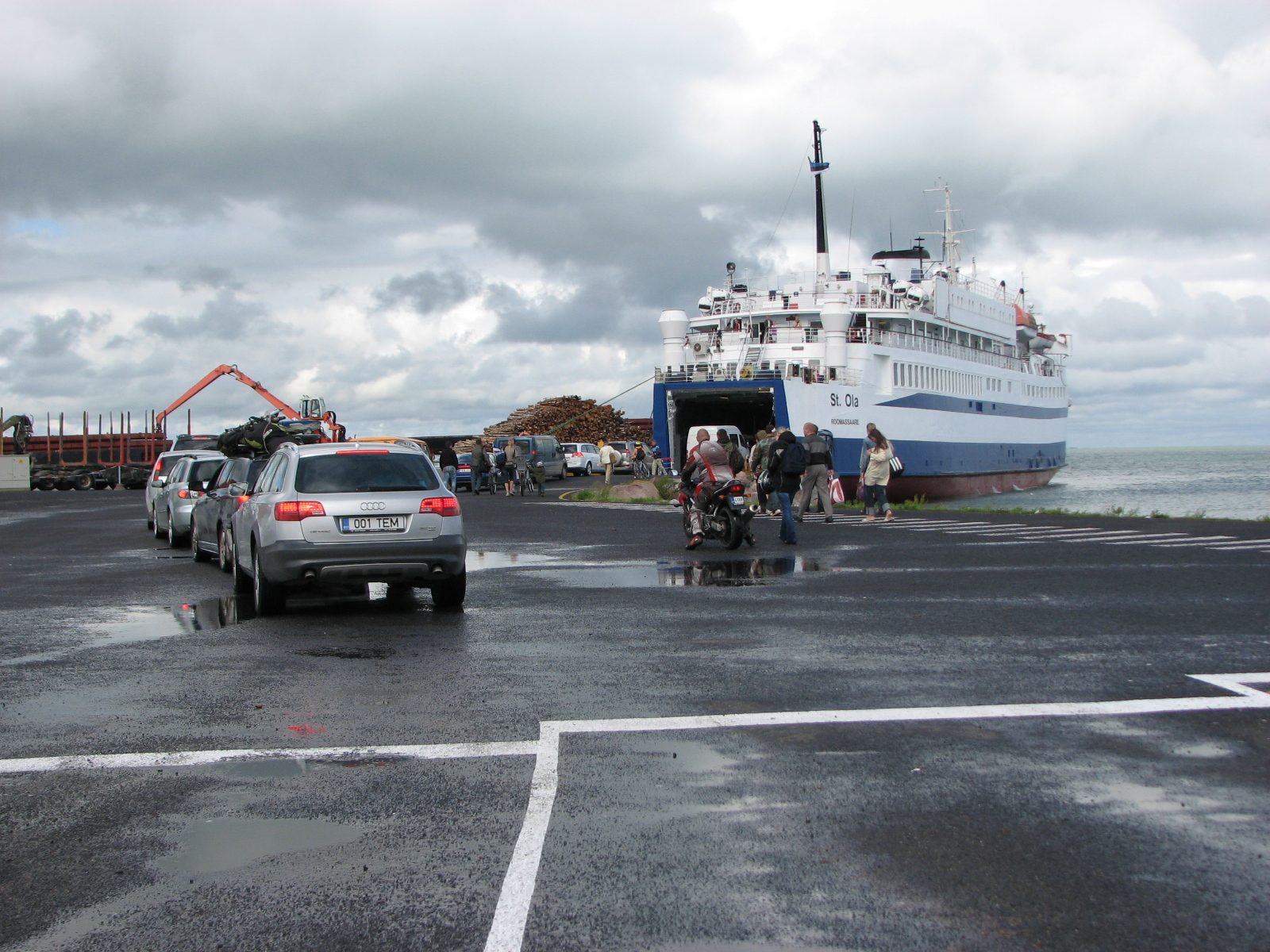
Cars boarding the ferry to mainland at Heltermaa

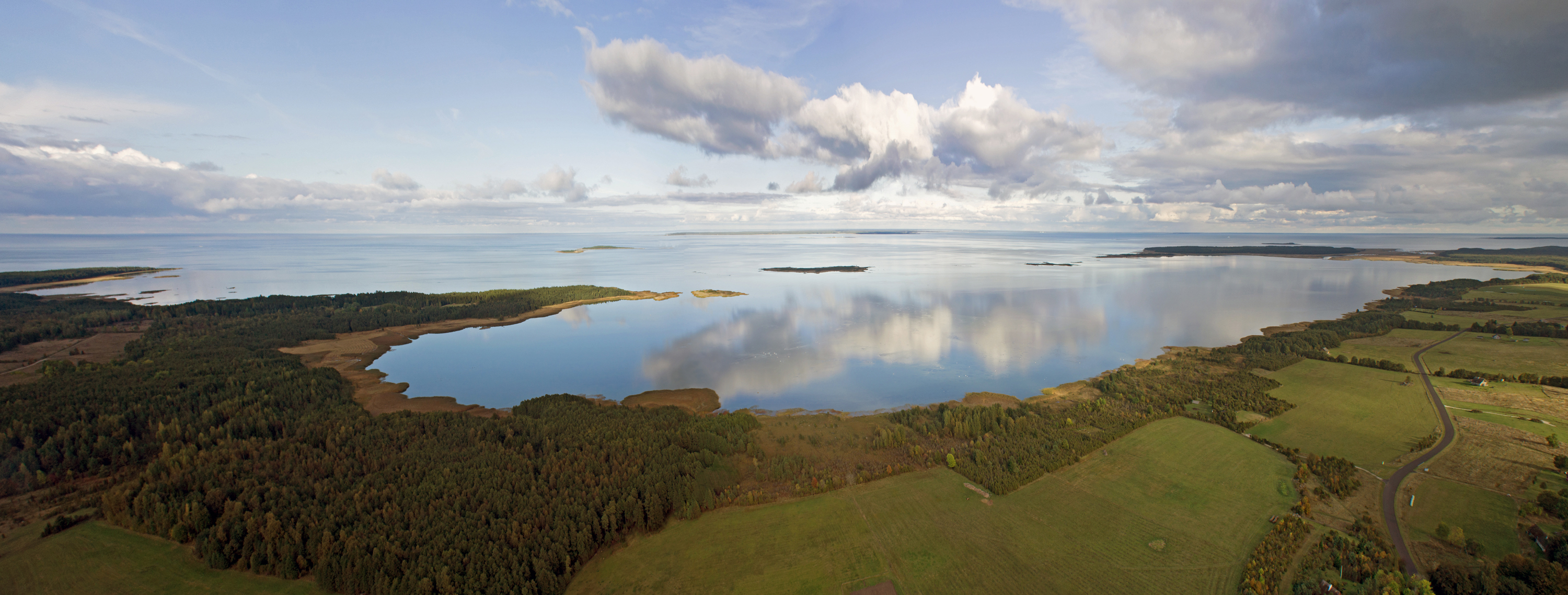
Coast of Hiiumaa

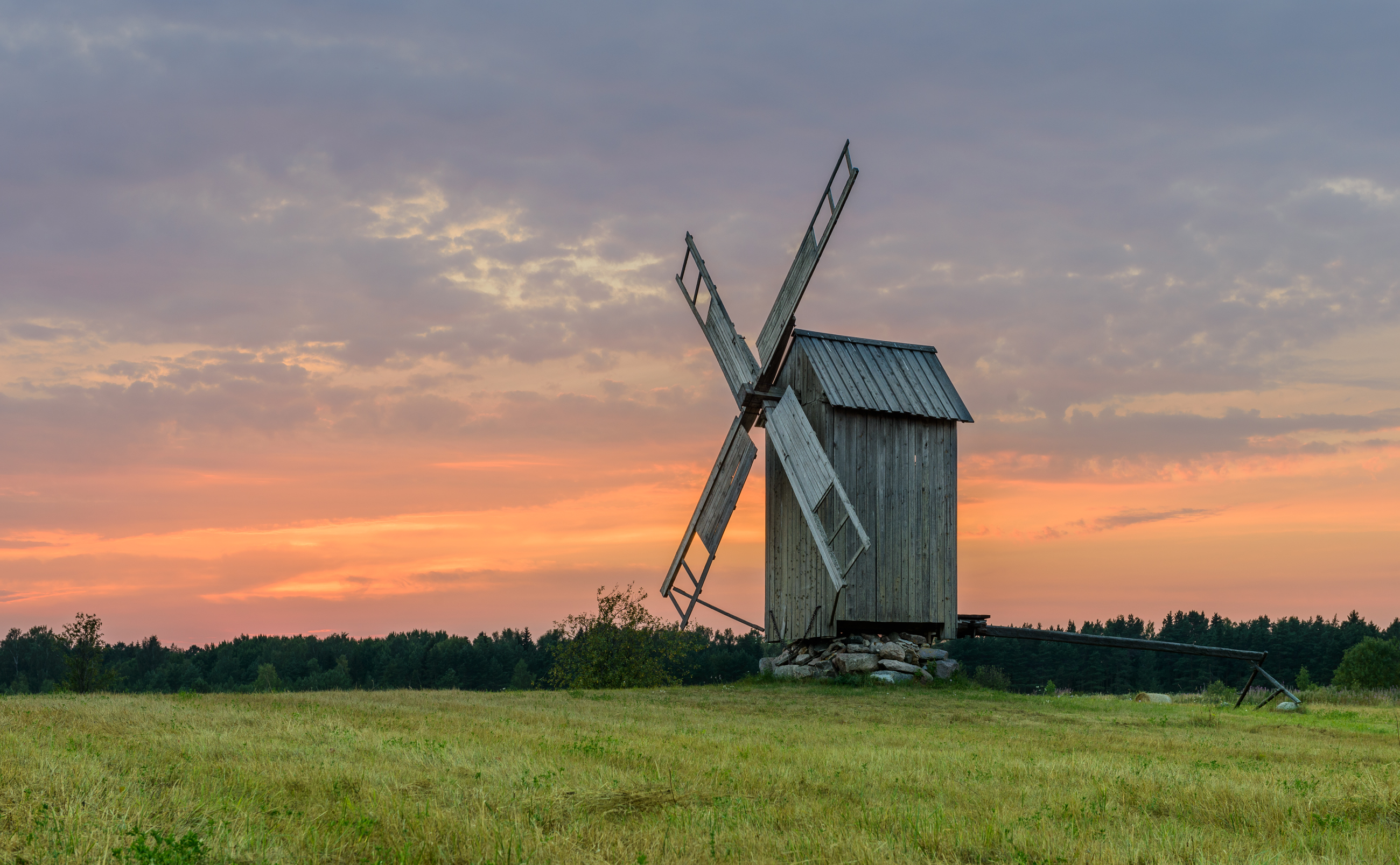
Tubala windmill

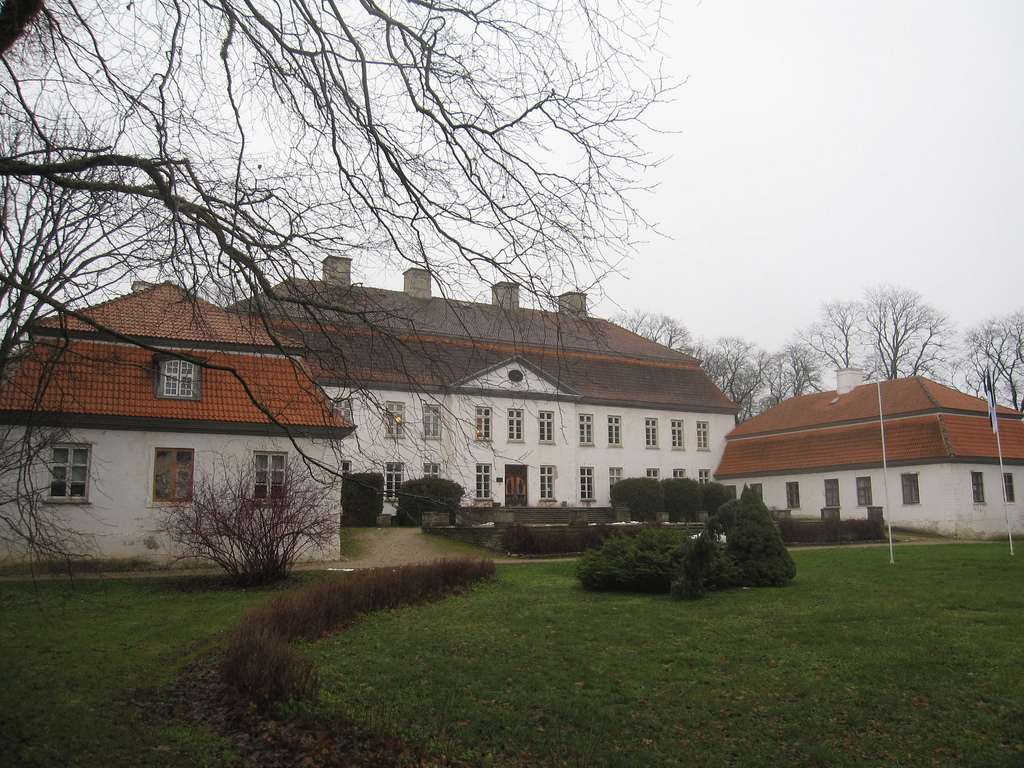
Suuremõisa Manor in Suuremõisa

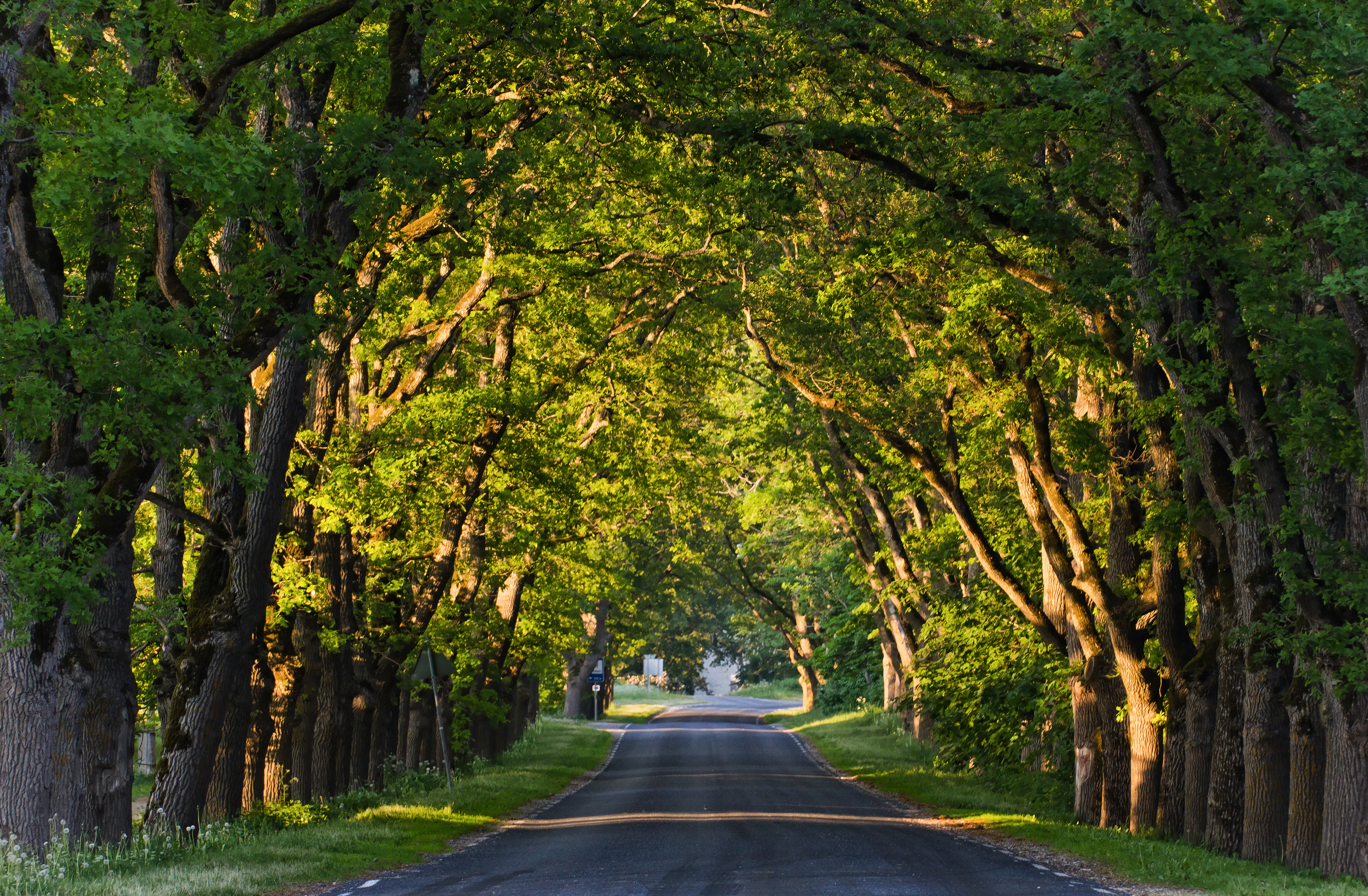
Avenue at Suuremõisa Park

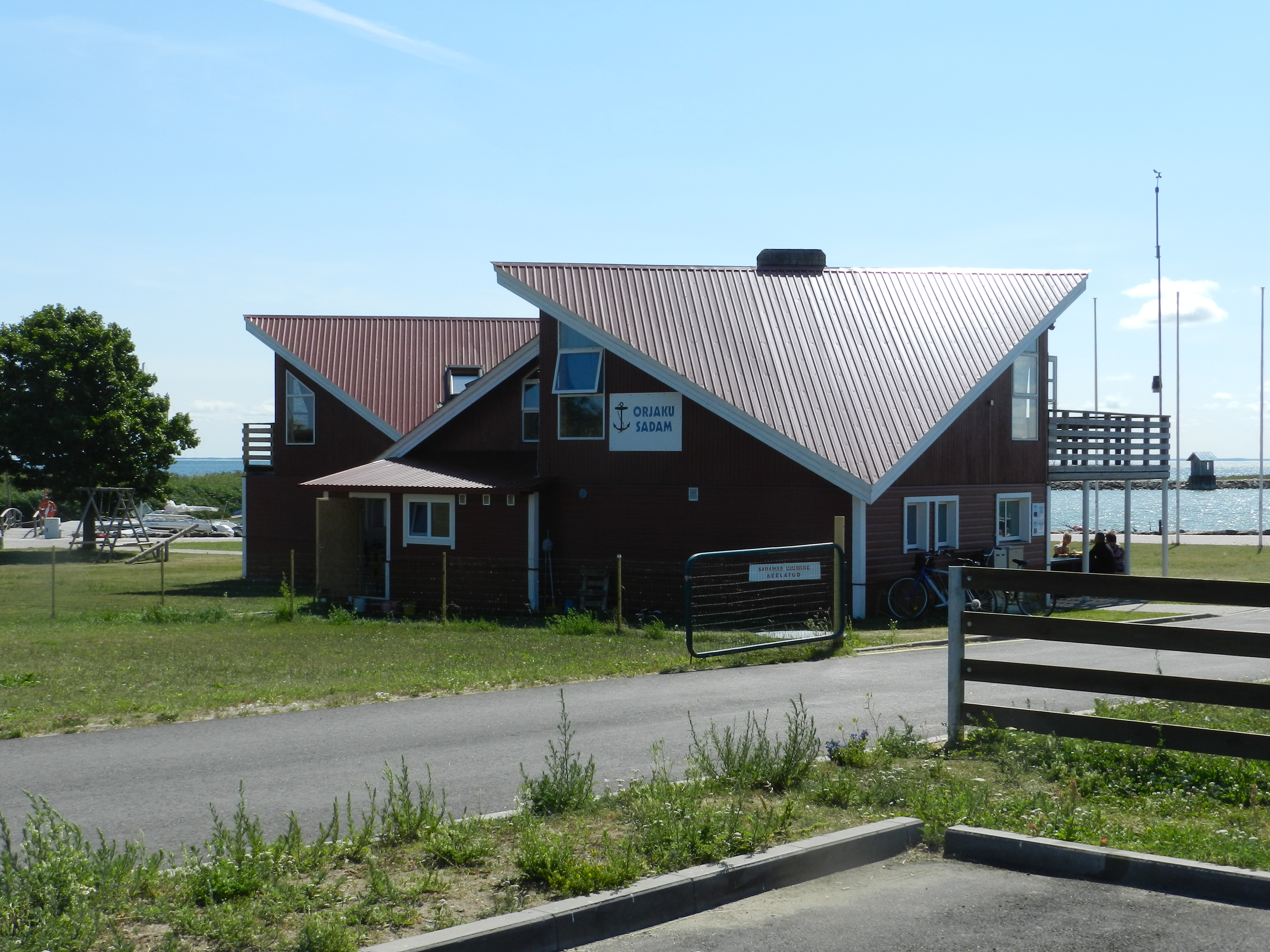
Café at Orjaku Harbor

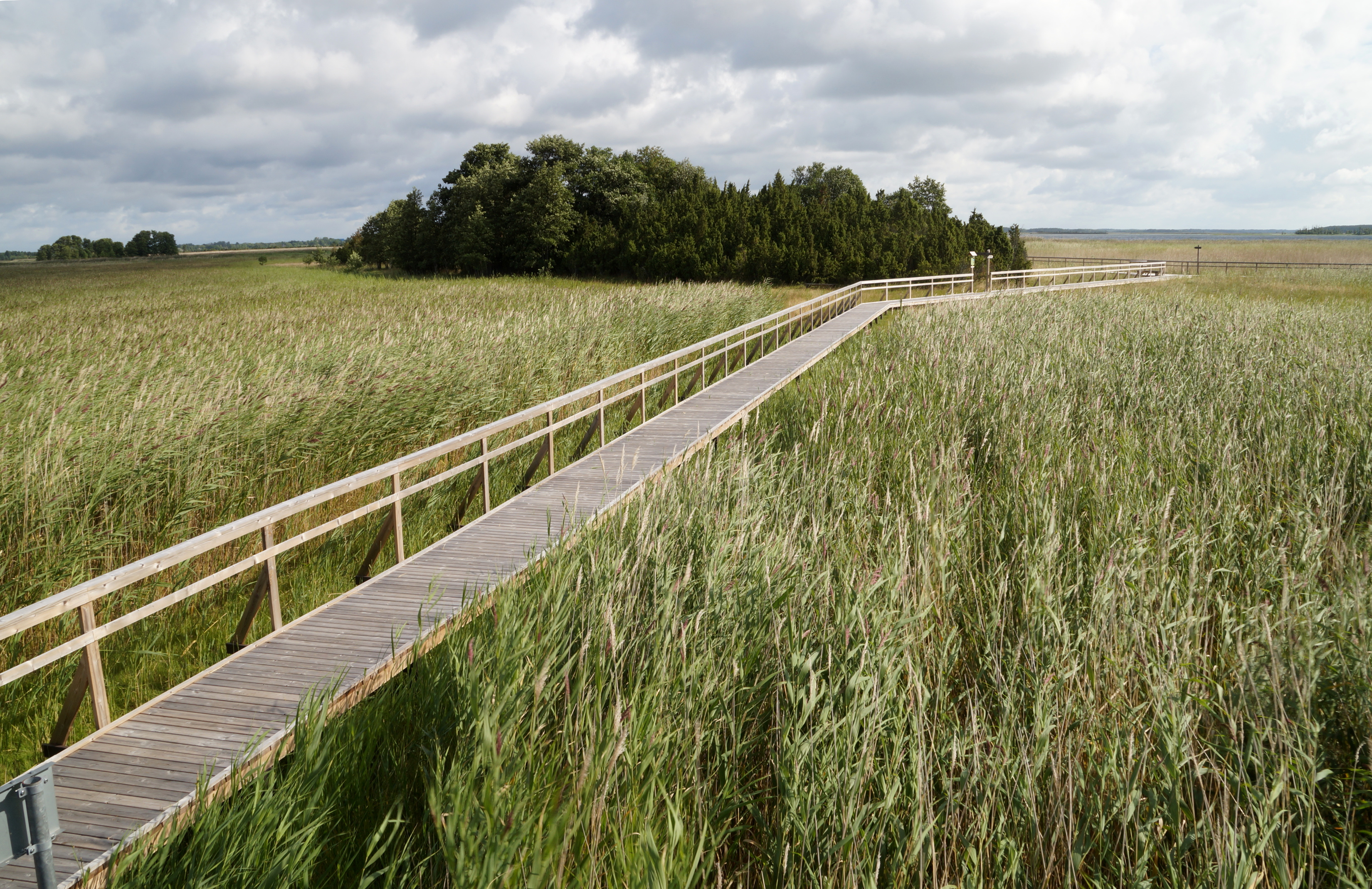
Nature trail near Orjaku

== See also ==
- List of islands of Estonia
- List of islands in the Baltic Sea
- Estonian Swedes
