= Maaker =

Family name

Maaker is an Estonian surname. Notable people with the surname include:

- Aleksander Maaker (1890–1968), Estonian folk musician
- Juhan Maaker (1845–1930), Estonian folk musician
- Villem Maaker (1891–1966), Estonian politician

== See also ==
- Maker (surname)
