= List of shipwrecks in July 1838 =

The list of shipwrecks in July 1838 includes ships sunk, foundered, wrecked, grounded, or otherwise lost during July 1838.

== 1 July ==
List of shipwrecks: 1 July 1838
Ship	State	Description
Amelia Maria	France	The brig was wrecked in the Gulf of Maracaibo. Most of her crew were murdered by the local inhabitants.

== 2 July ==
List of shipwrecks: 2 July 1838
Ship	State	Description
Comptroller	(United Kingdom of Great Britain and Ireland) Anguilla	The drogher was wrecked on the Prickly Pear Keys.
Cubana	United Kingdom	The ship was wrecked on the Bahama Banks. She was on a voyage from Swansea, Glamorgan to Havana, Cuba.

== 3 July ==
List of shipwrecks: 3 July 1838
Ship	State	Description
Louisa Ann	United Kingdom	The ship was wrecked off the Turks Islands. Her crew were rescued. She was on a voyage from Saint John, New Brunswick, British North America to Jamaica.

== 8 July ==
List of shipwrecks: 8 July 1838
Ship	State	Description
Antonio Perreira	United Kingdom	The ship departed from Singapore for China. No further trace, presumed foundered with the loss of all hands before 19 October.

== 11 July ==
List of shipwrecks: 11 July 1838
Ship	State	Description
Adonis	Lübeck	The sloop was wrecked at Kõpu, Russia. She was on a voyage from Lübeck to Porvoo, Grand Duchy of Finland.
Lowestoft	(United Kingdom of Great Britain and Ireland) New South Wales	The ship was wrecked on a reef off Waterhouse Island, Van Diemen's Land. She was on a voyage from Newcastle to Van Diemen's Land.
Neptune	(United Kingdom of Great Britain and Ireland) Antigua	The ship was driven ashore and wrecked on Antigua.
Robert Sergeant	United Kingdom	The ship ran ashore and was wrecked near Holyhead, Anglesey. Her crew were rescued. She was on a voyage from Livorno, Grand Duchy of Tuscany to Liverpool, Lancashire.

== 12 July ==
List of shipwrecks: 12 July 1838
Ship	State	Description
Robert Sargeant	United Kingdom	The ship was wrecked near Holyhead, Anglesey. Her crew were rescued. She was on a voyage from Livorno, Grand Duchy of Tuscany to Liverpool, Lancashire.

== 13 July ==
List of shipwrecks: 13 July 1838
Ship	State	Description
Eliza Jane	United Kingdom	The ship was wrecked in the Maldive Islands. Her crew were rescued. She was on a voyage from Mauritius to Pondicherry, India.

== 15 July ==
List of shipwrecks: 15 July 1838
Ship	State	Description
Nelly	United Kingdom	The sloop foundered off the Carr Rock, in the Firth of Forth.
Vrow Maria	Flag unknown	The ship ran aground off Rungsted, Denmark. She was refloated on 17 July and towed into Copenhagen by the steamship Princess Wilhemine (Denmark).
Wealands	United Kingdom	The ship ran aground on the Kentish Knock, in the North Sea. She was on a voyage from Sunderland, County Durham to Newhaven, Sussex. Wealands was refloated and put into Harwich, Essex in a leaky condition.

== 16 July ==
List of shipwrecks: 16 July 1838
Ship	State	Description
Elizabeth Clarke	United Kingdom	The ship was wrecked on the Cape Jack Shoals, off the coast of Nova Scotia, British North America. She was on a voyage from Pictou, Nova Scotia to Swansea, Glamorgan.

== 17 July ==
List of shipwrecks: 17 July 1838
Ship	State	Description
Aurora	United Kingdom	The ship struck a rock and sank off Cowhead, Newfoundland, British North America. Her crew were rescued.

== 18 July ==
List of shipwrecks: 18 July 1838
Ship	State	Description
Africa	United Kingdom	The ship foundered 40 nautical miles (74 km) south of Trincomalee, Ceylon. All on board were rescued.
Madawaska	United Kingdom	The ship was driven ashore on Brion Island, Magdalen Islands, Lower Canada, British North America. Her crew were rescued.

== 19 July ==
List of shipwrecks: 19 July 1838
Ship	State	Description
Elizabeth	United Kingdom	The brig ran aground on the Cape Jack Reef, in the Gut of Canso.

== 22 July ==
List of shipwrecks: 22 July 1838
Ship	State	Description
Moscow	United Kingdom	The ship was wrecked on the Lemon and Ore Sand, in the North Sea off the coast of Essex. Her crew were rescued. She was on a voyage from Saint Petersburg, Russia to Hull, Yorkshire. Moscow was subsequently taken into Harwich, Essex in a waterlogged condition.

== 23 July ==
List of shipwrecks: 23 July 1838
Ship	State	Description
Eurydice	(Russian Empire) Grand Duchy of Finland	The ship was driven ashore and wrecked near Zierikzee, Zeeland, Netherlands. She was on a voyage from Turku to Antwerp, Belgium.
Fasque	United Kingdom	The ship was wrecked on Grand Turk. She was on a voyage from Liverpool, Lancashire to Saint Andrews, New Brunswick, British North America and Jamaica.

== 25 July ==
List of shipwrecks: 25 July 1838
Ship	State	Description
Feronia	United Kingdom	The ship struck the Mixen Sand, in the Bristol Channel and foundered off The Mumbles, Glamorgan. Her crew were rescued. She was on a voyage from Ulverstone, Lancashire to Aberavon, Glamorgan.

== 26 July ==
List of shipwrecks: 26 July 1838
Ship	State	Description
Hannah	United Kingdom	The ship was wrecked at Gabarus, Nova Scotia, British North America. She was on a voyage from Bordeaux, Gironde, France to Miramichi, New Brunswick, British North America.
John and Elizabeth	United Kingdom	The ship sprang a leak and was beached at Rye, Sussex. She was on a voyage from Newcastle upon Tyne, Northumberland to Southampton, Hampshire. Once repaired, she resumed her voyage.
Thomas Moulden	United Kingdom	The ship was wrecked near "Cape Brullos".
Wellington	United Kingdom	The ship was destroyed by fire off the Isle of Wight. She was on a voyage from London to Liverpool, Lancashire.

== 28 July ==
List of shipwrecks: 28 July 1838
Ship	State	Description
Maria	Wismar	The ship was driven ashore in the River Thames at Coal House Point. She was on a voyage from Wismar to London, United Kingdom.

== 29 July ==
List of shipwrecks: 29 July 1838
Ship	State	Description
Levant	United Kingdom	The ship was driven ashore near Mazara del Vallo, Sicily. She was on a voyage from Smyrna, Ottoman Empire to Falmouth, Cornwall. Levant was refloated on 10 August and sailed for Malta to be repaired there.

== 31 July ==
List of shipwrecks: 31 July 1838
Ship	State	Description
Granville	United Kingdom	The ship was wrecked on Cape Sable Island, Nova Scotia, British North America. All on board were rescued. She was on a voyage from Sligo to Saint John, New Brunswick, British North America.

== Unknown date ==
List of shipwrecks: Unknown date July 1838
Ship	State	Description
Bonne Nannette	France	The ship was lost near Guadeloupe before 2 July. All on board were rescued.
Bridget	United Kingdom	The brig was lost off Formosa Island, Africa before 17 July. Her crew were rescued. She was on a voyage from Liverpool, Lancashire to an African port.
Despique	Brazil	The ship was lost off the coast of Rio Grande do Norte. She was on a voyage from Porto d'Assu to Pernambuco.
Fort William	United Kingdom	The ship capsized in the Indian Ocean on or before 5 July.
Harmosa Louisa	Mexico	The ship departed from Canton, China for San Blas Atempa. No further trace, presumed foundered with the loss of all hands.
Hercules	United Kingdom	The paddle steamer was driven ashore at Ardmore Head, County Waterford. She was on a voyage from Dublin to Cork.
Margaret	United Kingdom	The ship was driven ashore near Shelburne, Nova Scotia, British North America before 10 July. She was on a voyage from Cork to Saint Andrews, New Brunswick, British North America.
Rob Roy	(United Kingdom of Great Britain and Ireland) New South Wales	The schooner was wrecked at Nobbys Head, Newcastle.
Scipio	Hamburg	The ship was driven ashore in the Elbe. She was on a voyage from Hamburg to Newfoundland, British North America. Scipio was refloated and resumed her voyage, but she put into Torbay for repairs on 24 July.
Stamper	United Kingdom	The ship was driven ashore at Whitehaven, Cumberland. She was on a voyage from Richibucto, New Brunswick, British North America to Whitehaven.
