= Liisi (island) =

Estonian island

Coordinates: 58.5411°N 23.1394°E

Liisi is an uninhabited island of Estonia in Saare County, located in the Baltic Sea as part of the West Estonian Archipelago. The island is two hectares in size and has a coastline of 594 meters.

== See also ==
- List of islands of Estonia
