= Tahkuna Nature Reserve =

Protected area in Estonia

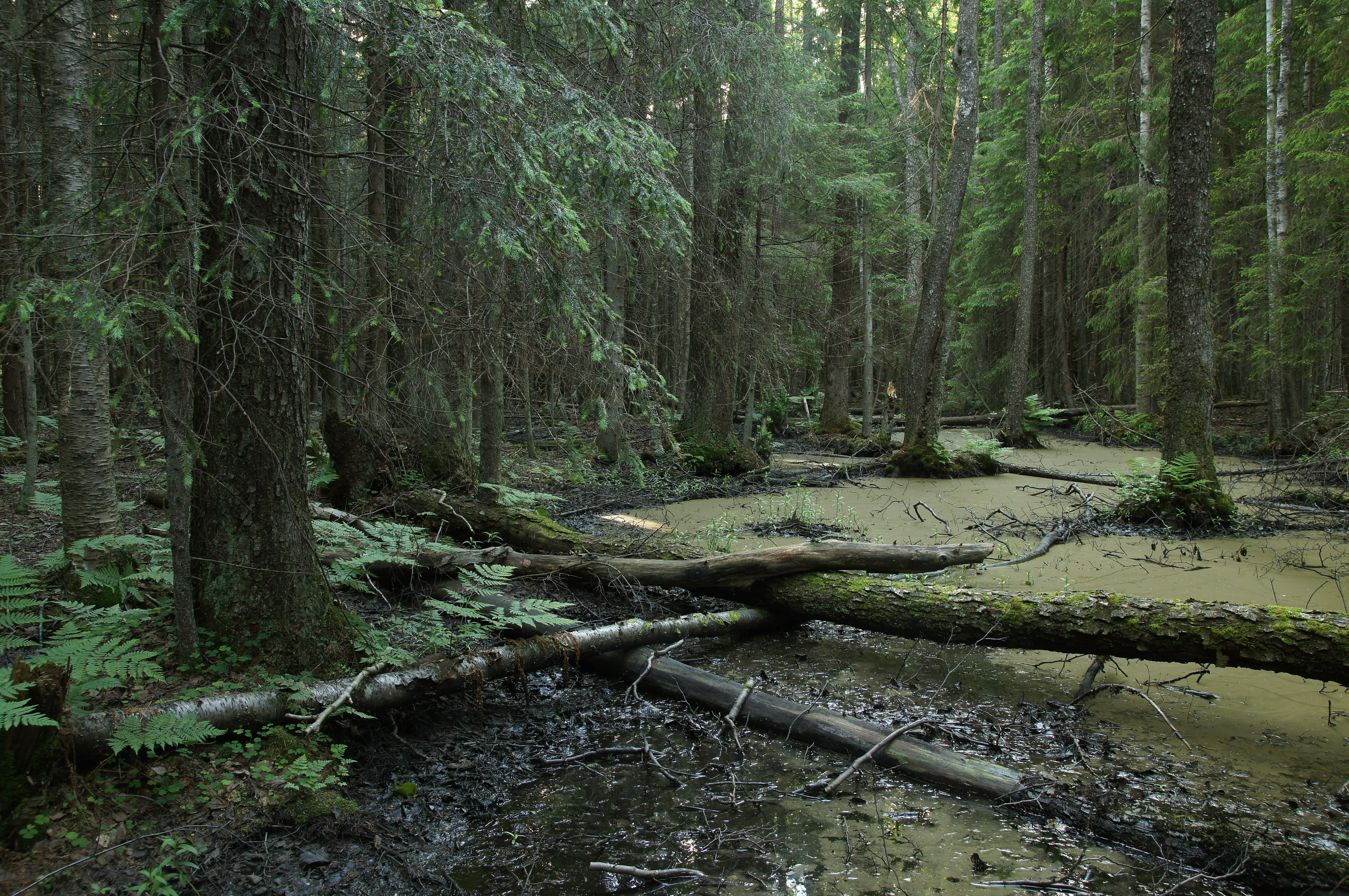
- Forest in Tahkuna Nature Reserve

- Location within Estonia
- Location: Estonia
- Nearest city: Kärdla
- Coordinates: 59°4′46″N 22°35′53″E
- Area: 1,869 ha (4,620 acres)

Tahkuna Nature Reserve is a nature reserve situated on Hiiumaa in western Estonia, in Hiiu County.

The 1,869 hectare Tahkuna nature reserve has been created in order to protect areas of forest which have remained largely unaffected by human activity. The nature reserve also incorporates Estonia's largest single habitat of yew, dune forests and mires. A forest trail for visitors has been constructed in the nature reserve. The fauna is varied and the reserve is home to several nesting birds, e.g. spotted crake and white-tailed eagle. The flora contains several species of orchids; Corallorhiza trifida and Goodyera repens are common.

== History ==
In 1924, clear-cutting was banned in the area of the yew trees growing in Tahkuna. The current conservation regulations were approved in 2006. On 6 November 1936, the Government of the Republic of Estonia decided to protect 4 forest quarters of the Kärdla Forest District, totalling 74.2 hectares, where felling of yew trees and grazing of animals were prohibited.

On 28 May 1958, 20 September 1961 and 25 September 1962, the executive committee of the Hiiumaa District TSN decided to step up the protection of the yew-growing area. The protection area for the yuca trees was damaged in August 1967.

Tahkuna Nature Reserve was established on 2 February 1997.
