= Aleksander Maaker =

Estonian folk musician

- Born: 20 October 1890; Muda, Hiiumaa
- Died: 28 January 1968 (aged 77)
- Other name: Torupilli-Sass
- Occupation: folk musician
- Known for: bagpipe

Aleksander Maaker (20 October [O.S. 8 October] 1890 in Muda, Hiiumaa – 28 January 1968), nicknamed Torupilli-Sass was a folk musician, a player of the traditional torupill, the Estonian bagpipe. Maaker was from the Estonian island of Hiiumaa. At the time of his death, the only other torupill player was the revivalist Olev Roomet, at the time a choir member, though other revivalist such as Ants Taul took up the instrument and its construction beginning in the 1970s.

Aleksander Maaker learned bagpipe playing from his uncle Juhan Maaker (1845–1930) (Torupilli-Juss) one of the most popular folk musicians in Estonia called the "king of bagpipe players" at the time.
