= Suuremõisa Park =

Park in Estonia

Coordinates: 58°52′14″N 22°56′46.9″E

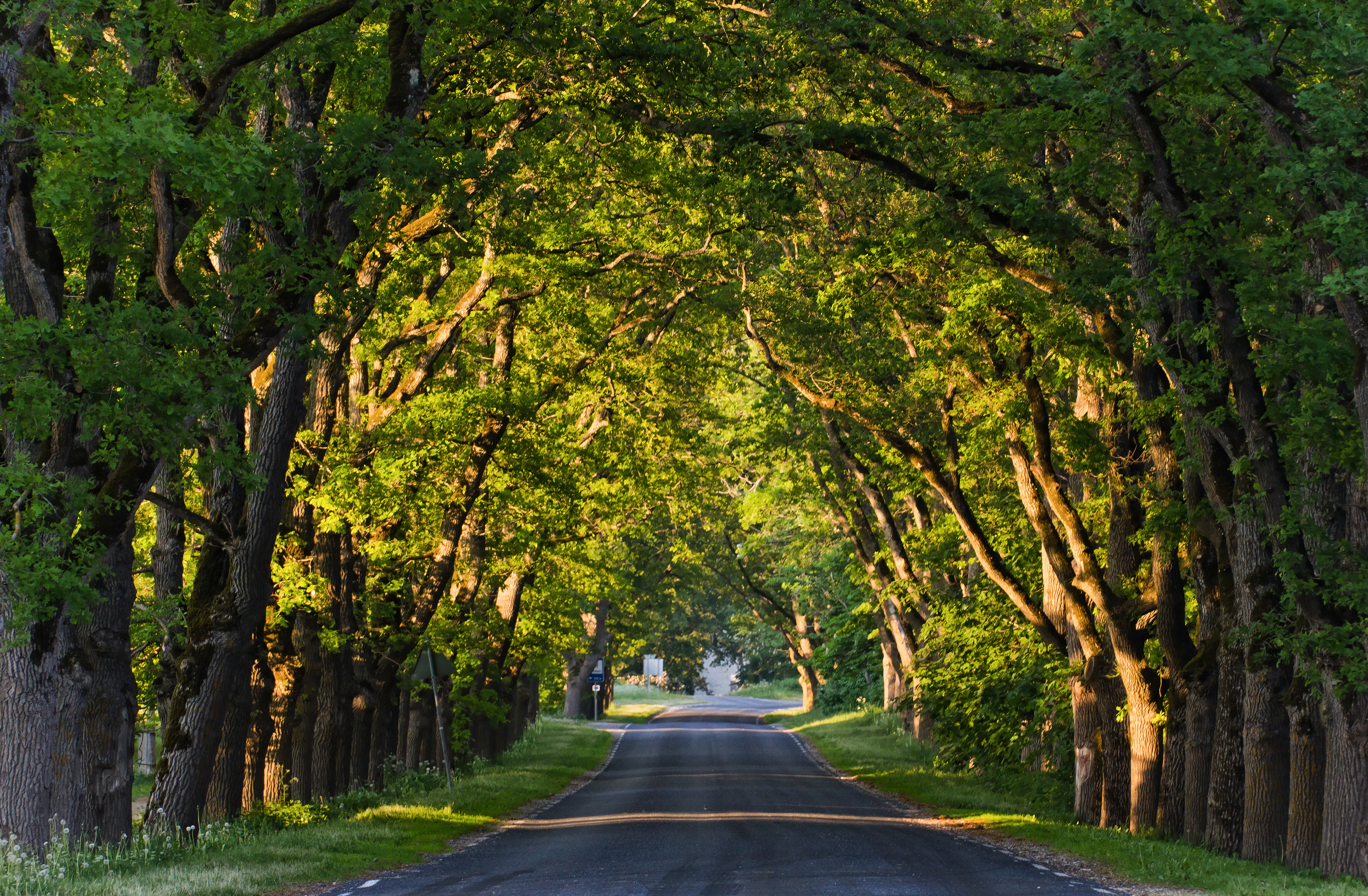
Tree-lined avenue or allee at Suuremõisa Park

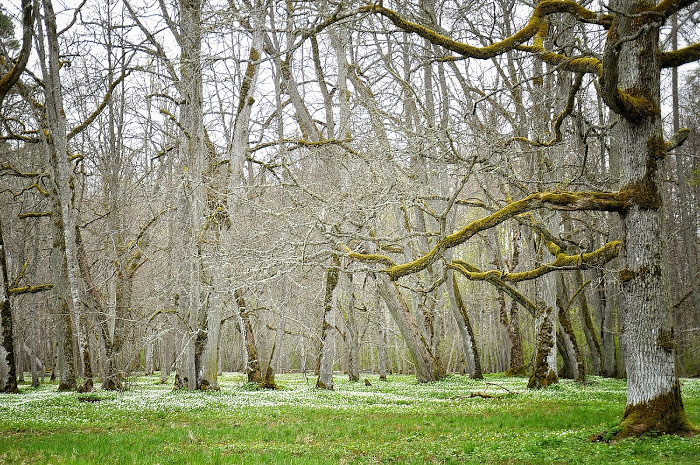
Suuremõisa Park in May

Suuremõisa Park (Estonian Suuremõisa 'Big Manor') is the largest park on the Estonian island of Hiiumaa. It is in the village of Suuremõisa, which itself surrounds Suuremõisa Manor. The park covers 45 hectares (110 acres). The manor and park are Estonian cultural heritage monument number 23623.

The park was founded by Countess Ebba Margareta von Stenbock (1704–1775) (née De la Gardie) during the construction of Suuremõisa manor in 1755. The park was originally planned to be in the Baroque style, and the portions closest to the castle (terraces, roads, and ponds) reflect this design. Later portions of the park were built in the English style. The oldest portions of the park, to the east behind the main building, are surrounded by a 2 metres (6.6 ft) high wall topped with red roof tiles. Little remains of the walls to the west of the main building.

The main portion of the park is in front (west) of the manor. The park is mostly level with the exception being a hill found between the two ponds. This hill was once topped by a small cottage known as “Babylon”. The name came from the locals mispronouncing the name of the adjacent “pavilion”. The ponds are spring fed and separate the park from the apple orchard. The ponds have been also used to raise fish. To the west of the castle, the Suuremõisa River flows through the park from north to south. A forest park stretches from the western banks of the river to the village of Salinõmme.

The park contains about fifty varieties of trees and shrubs, including Estonia's tallest European Silver Fir (Abies alba) whose height was measured to be 36 metres (118 ft) in 2000, Estonia's tallest Sitka Spruce (Picea sitchensis) (15 metres (49 ft)), and Estonia's tallest Japanese Larch (Larix kaempferi) (15 metres (49 ft)). The largest European Ash (Fraxinus excelsior) is (32 metres (105 ft)) tall and 2.2 metres (7.2 ft) in circumference. The largest wych elm is 25 meters (82 feet) tall and 2.1 meters (6.9 feet) circumference and the largest tilia is 21 meters (69 feet) tall and 2.4 meters (7.9 feet) circumference. The park contains allees of oak, horse chestnut, and maple. White pine, Swiss pine, balsam fir, Northern Oak, and white spruce are also found in the park.

Outside the park boundaries lie several kilometers of Black Alder allees that delineate an old road towards the town of Käina.

Since 1959 the park has been under the protection of a nature conservancy.
