= Ants Taul =

Estonian musician and instrument-maker (born 1950)

Ants Taul (born 7 March 1950 in Tõrva) is an Estonian musician and instrument-maker who played a prominent role in the revival of the Estonian bagpipe, the torupill. As early as 1976 (when he was 26), Taul was recognised as one of Estonia's primary bagpipers, with piper Olev Roomet having retired due to ill health.

Taul continued to play, including representing Estonia in musical exhibitions with other folk musicians in the 1980s.

Ants' son, Andrus, continues to make and play the torupill as had his father.

== Discography ==
- Estonie: Airs Anciennes. Ocora France, 2000. ASIN: B00004SRI5
- Gajdy and Bock / Goat and Billygoat: Bagpipes from Central Europe. PAN Records, 2008. ASIN: B003T8P4UQ
