= Kõrgessaare =

Borough in Estonia

- Small borough
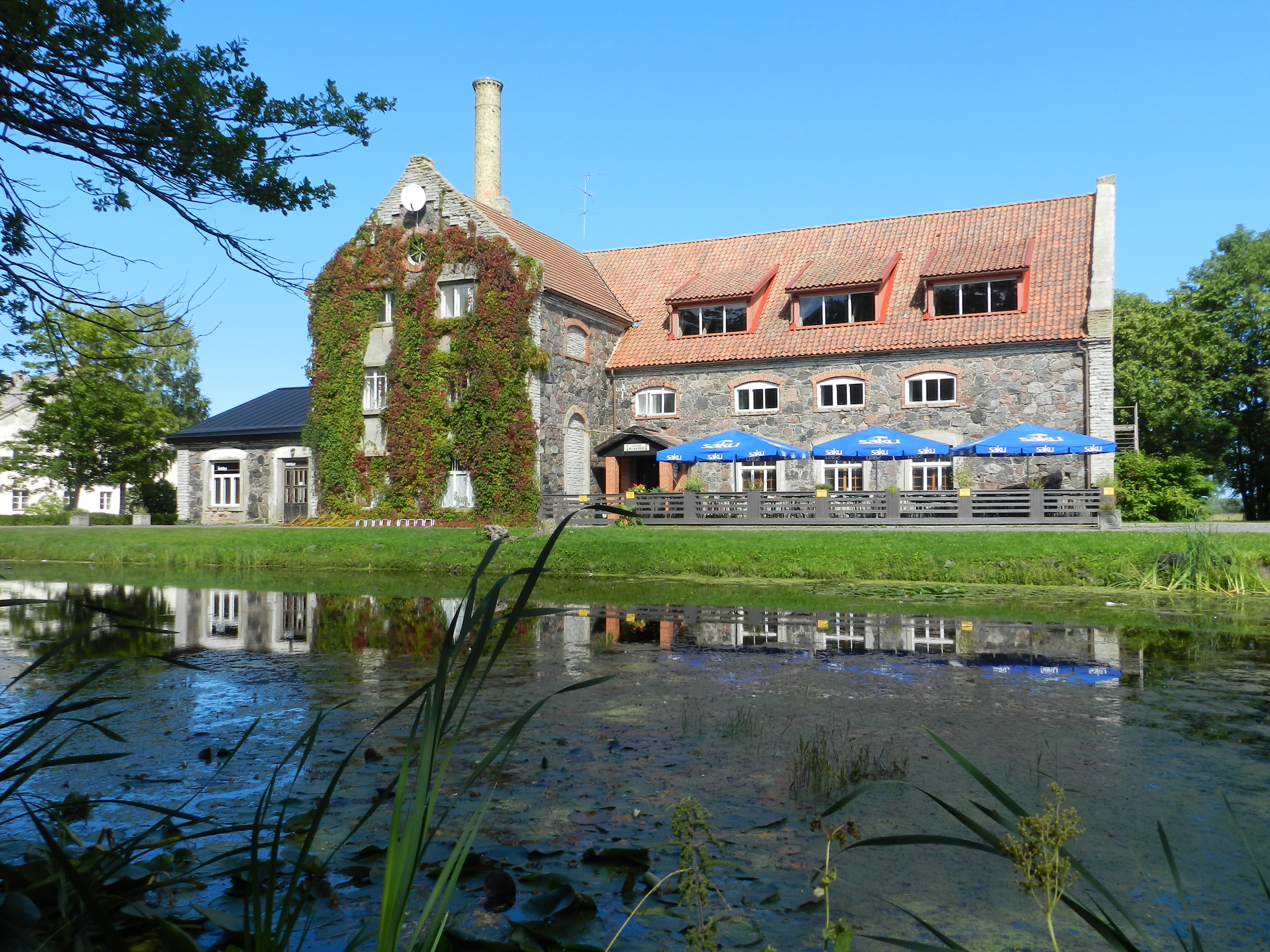
- Kõrgessaare manor

- Location within Estonia
- Coordinates: 58°58′52″N 22°28′01″E
- Country: Estonia
- County: Hiiu County
- Parish: Hiiumaa Parish

Population (2020)
  - Total: 353
- Time zone: UTC+2 (EET)
  - Summer (DST): UTC+3 (EEST)

Kõrgessaare (German: Hohenholm) is a small borough (alevik) in Hiiumaa Parish, Hiiu County, Estonia, on the northwestern coast of Hiiumaa island.
