= Muda, Estonia =

Village in Estonia

Muda
- Village
- Location within Estonia
- Coordinates: 58°46′N 22°38′E
- Country: Estonia
- County: Hiiu County
- Parish: Hiiumaa Parish
- Time zone: UTC+2 (EET)
  - Summer (DST): UTC+3 (EEST)

Muda is a village in Hiiumaa Parish, Hiiu County in northwestern Estonia.

Bagpipe players Juhan Maaker (1845–1930) and Aleksander Maaker (1890–1968) were born and lived in Muda.
