= West Estonian Archipelago Biosphere Reserve =

Protected area in Estonia

- Location within Estonia
- Location: West Estonian archipelago, Estonia
- Coordinates: 58°18′0″N 22°30′0″E
- Area: 15,600 square kilometres (6,000 sq mi)
- Established: 1990
- Governing body: Counties of Hiiumaa, Saaremaa and Läänemaa

The West Estonian Archipelago Biosphere Reserve (established 1990) is a UNESCO Biosphere Reserve in Estonia, located in the West Estonian archipelago in the eastern Baltic Sea. The 15,600 square kilometres (6,000 sq mi) reserve comprises the islands of Saaremaa, Hiiumaa, Vormsi and Muhu, as well as numerous islets and marine parts. The islands are in the transition zone between temperate needle-leaf and broadleaf forest.

== Ecological characteristics ==
The West Estonian Archipelago is located in the southern part of the boreal forest zone of the northern hemisphere, where the south-taiga forest subzone changes into spruce-hardwood subzone. Phytogeographically, Estonia belongs to the Euro-Siberian region of the Holarctic realm.

The archipelago represents the ecosystems that have been formed on the coastal formations of different developmental phases of the Baltic Sea in the last ten thousand years. The distinctive features and diversity of nature in the West Estonian islands is mainly influenced by the geographical position, young age of the area, lime-richness of soils and centuries of human activity.

A long coastline with both low and dune beaches, low bays with small islets and holms and thousands of years of land use has formed the structure of the islands' forests, meadows, arable land and pastures, the result of which is a mosaic landscape and the diverse nature of the islands. Terrestrial habitats contain pine forests, mixed spruce and deciduous woodlands, juniper and coastal meadows, swamps and peat bogs. The alvar forests (spruce, pine or birch forest on limestone plains with thin soils) are of particular interest. Parts of the area are designated as wetlands considered important according to Ramsar specifications.

Valuable ecosystems consist of the shallows of the Baltic sea, islets, lagoons, grasslands (coastal, alvar, alluvial or marshy), woodlands and wooded meadows.

== Human activities ==
As of 2012, the population of the reserve was about 43,000. Primary human activities include food industry (fishing, dairy, bakery); forestry and timber industry; plastic industry; electronics industry; trade; transportation; and tourism.

== Sources ==
This article incorporates text from a free content work (license statement/permission). Text taken from UNESCO - MAB Biosphere Reserves Directory, UNESCO, UNESCO.
