= Juhan Maaker =

Estonian musician

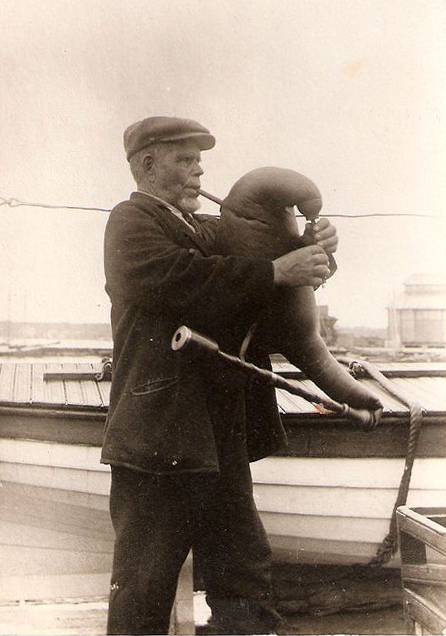
- Born: 26 March 1845; Muda, Hiiumaa
- Died: 21 September 1930 (aged 85); Muda, Hiiumaa
- Other name: Torupilli-Juss
- Occupation: folk musician
- Known for: bagpipe

Juhan Maaker (26 March [O.S. 14 March] 1845 – 21 September 1930) nicknamed Torupilli-Juss was an Estonian folk musician, a player of the Estonian bagpipe. He was considered one of the most popular players at the time called the king of bagpipe players.

During his lifetime Juhan Maaker performed with great success in hundreds of concert halls and became popular all over Estonia and also in Finland. In 1927-28 he took part of five concert tours in Estonia organized by August Pulst, an activist in promoting folk music in cooperation with the Estonian Open-Air Museum Society giving all together 244 concerts.

36 pieces performed by Juhan Maakeri have been preserved and digitized from Phonograph wax cylinders found in the Estonian Literature museum.

During his lifetime a sculpture of Juhan Maaker was made by the Estonian National Museum's sponsorship.

After Juhan Maaker's nephew Aleksander Maaker (1890–1968) death there was only one surviving bagpipe player alive in Estonia: Olev Roomet who became the revivalist of bagpipe in the country by training 25 new players in the 1970s.

In modern times bagpipe playing is a part of the curriculum at University of Tartu Viljandi Culture Academy's Traditional Music faculty and in a number of regular music schools around the country.
