= Tubala =

Village in Estonia

- Village
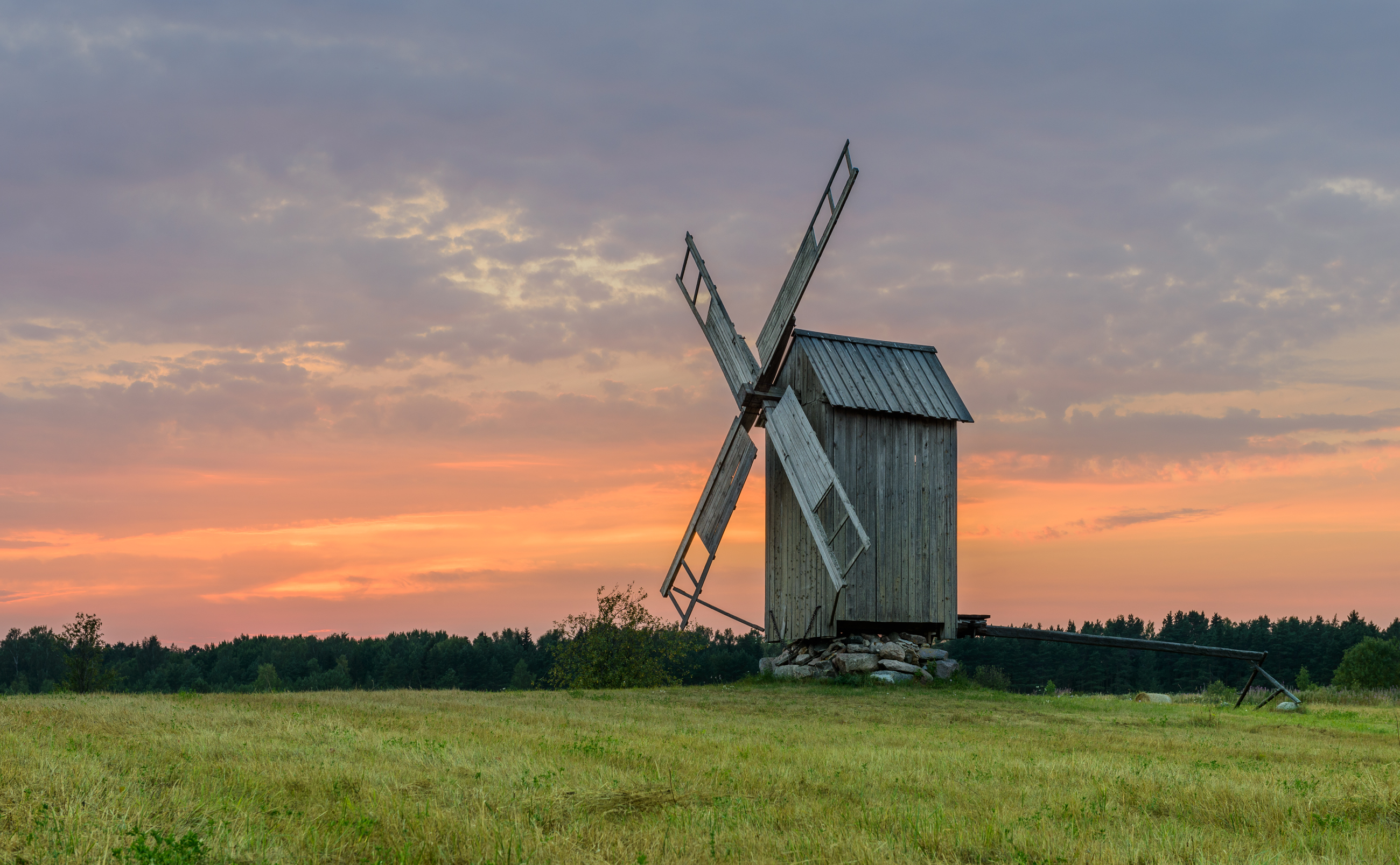
- Tubala windmill

- Location within Estonia
- Coordinates: 58°57′N 22°46′E
- Country: Estonia
- County: Hiiu County
- Parish: Hiiumaa Parish
- Time zone: UTC+2 (EET)
  - Summer (DST): UTC+3 (EEST)

Tubala is a village in Hiiumaa Parish, Hiiu County in northwestern Estonia.

== Traditions ==
Tubala hosts a large post ('Tubala Vai') which, according to local folklore, keeps Hiiumaa anchored to the seabed. On July 28th 2003, the local cultural fund of Kõpu Lighthouse restored the post. Every year on the 28th of July, the names of the largest donors of the previous year are pounded into the post with iron nails.

== Gallery ==
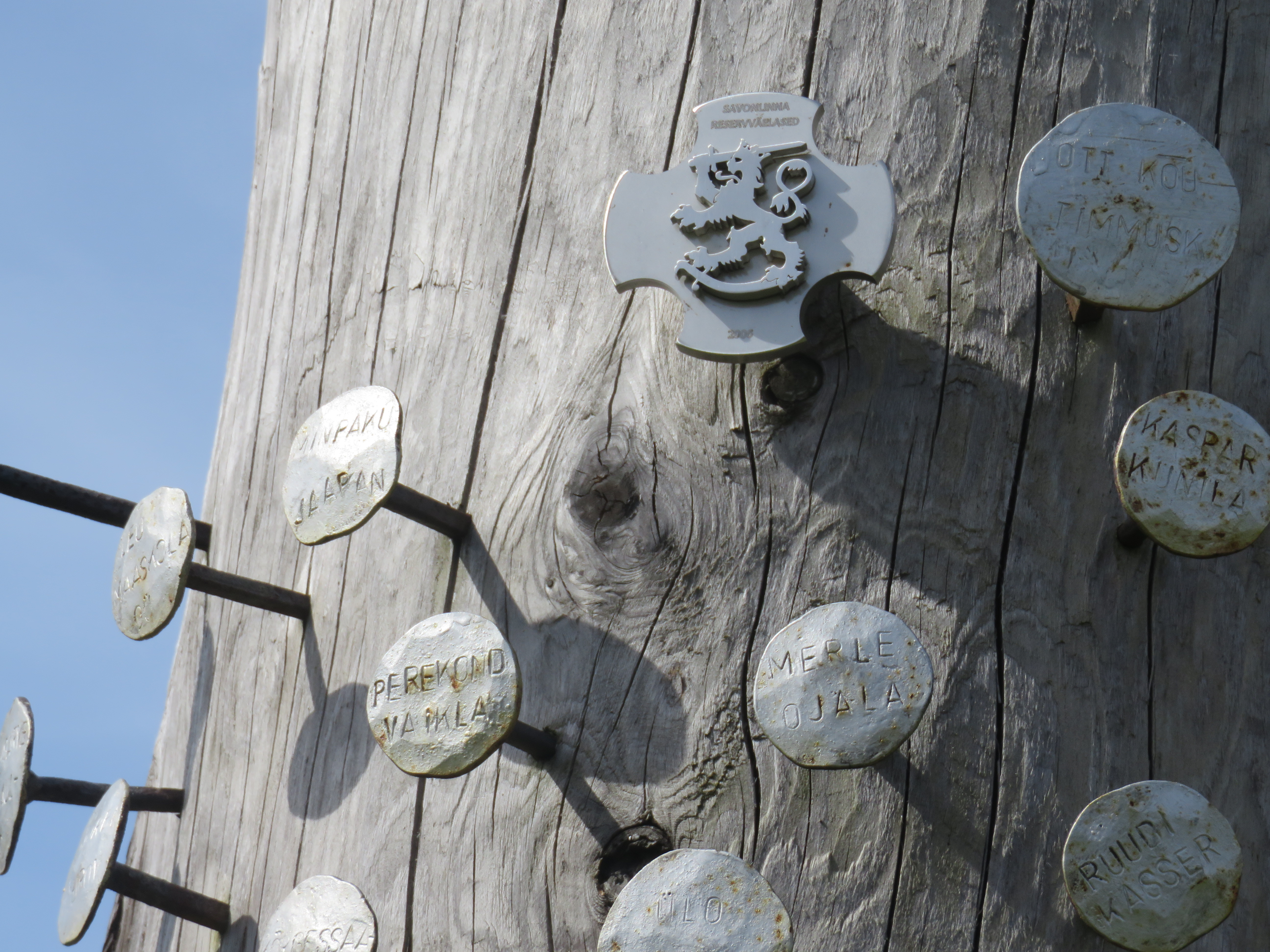
Nails in Tubala Post
