= Suuremõisa, Hiiu County =

Village in Estonia

Suuremõisa
- Village
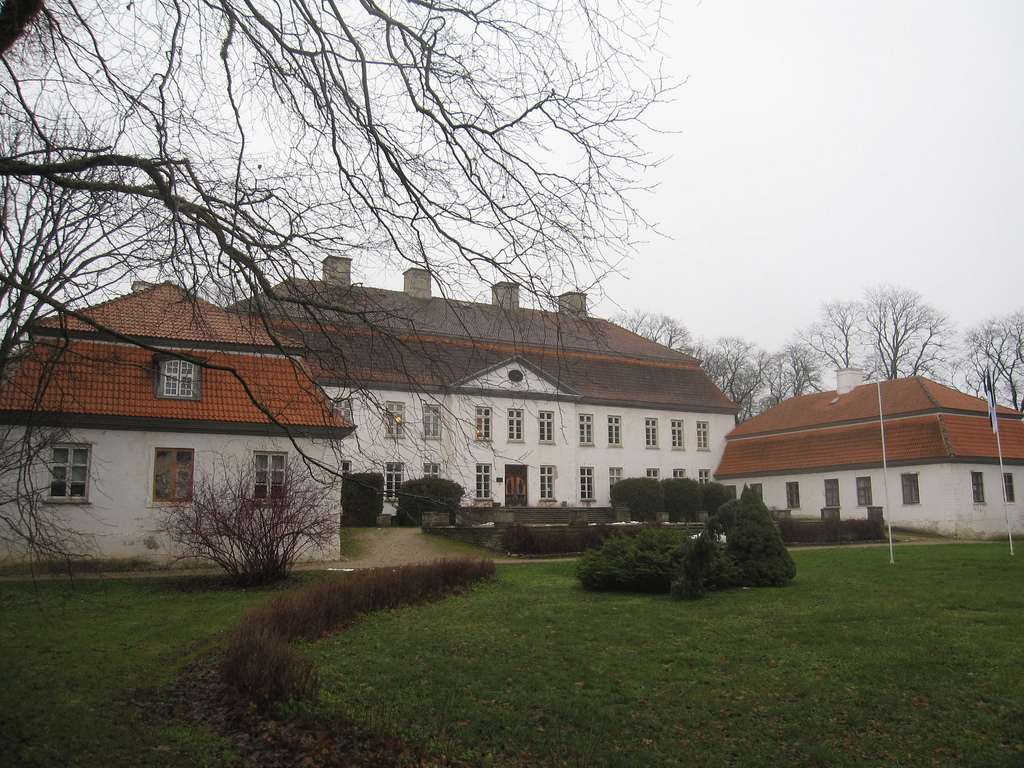
- Suuremõisa Manor

- Location within Estonia
- Coordinates: 58°52′N 22°57′E
- Country: Estonia
- County: Hiiu County
- Parish: Hiiumaa Parish

Area
  - Total: 8.1 km^{2} (3.1 sq mi)

Population
  - Total: 299
- Time zone: UTC+2 (EET)
  - Summer (DST): UTC+3 (EEST)

Suuremõisa (Swedish: Storhovet; German: Großenhof) is a village in Hiiumaa Parish, Hiiu County in northwestern Estonia.

With 299 inhabitants, it is the largest village in the municipality.

Soviet Estonian politician Meta Vannas (1924–2002) was born in Suuremõisa.

== Suuremõisa Manor ==
Suuremõisa is the site of one of the largest baroque manor ensembles in Estonia. Although the history of the estate can be traced back to at least the 16th century, the current building was erected in 1755–60 by the Stenbock family. The architect was probably Joseph Gabriel Destain. In 1772, the main house was extended with two one-floor wings and a ceremonial courtyard. Inspiration for the architecture, notably the hipped mansard roof and the two wings, came from Ulriksdal Palace in Sweden. The building ensemble still displays some of the original details, such as the carved baroque main door.

The manor belonged to several noted members of the Swedish and Baltic German nobility. These included Jacob De la Gardie (1583–1652), who served as Governor-General of Estonia, and his son Axel Julius De la Gardie (1637–1710), who held the same office. A later owner, Otto Reinhold Ludwig von Ungern-Sternberg (1744–1811), practised wrecking and was sent to Siberia in 1804 as punishment for murdering a Swedish skipper. His life has inspired literary works and local folklore.

The manor is surrounded by an English-style park.
