= West Estonian archipelago =

Group of Estonian islands

Coordinates: 58°30′N 23°0′E

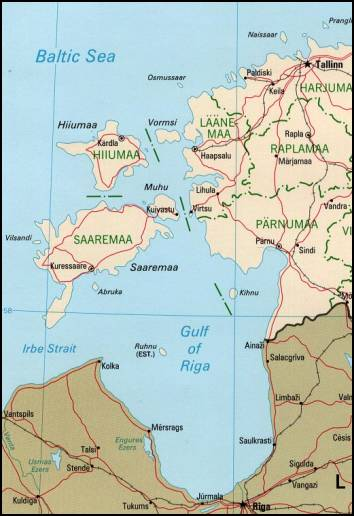
Moonsund archipelago

The West Estonian archipelago (Estonian: Lääne-Eesti saarestik, also Moonsund archipelago) is a group of Estonian islands located in the Baltic Sea around Väinameri. The total area is about 4,000 km^{2} (1,500 sq mi). The archipelago is composed of the islands Saaremaa, Hiiumaa, Muhu, Vormsi and about 900 other smaller islands. The archipelago is separated from the Estonian mainland by the Väinameri Sea.

== Protected areas ==
UNESCO established the West Estonian Archipelago Biosphere Reserve in 1990 under the Man and the Biosphere Programme.

== See also ==
- List of islands of Estonia
- Estonian Swedes
