= Maker (surname) =

Maker is a surname. Notable people with the surname include:

- Joyce Maker, American politician
- Michael J. Maker (born 1969), American horse trainer
- Mike Maker (basketball) (born 1965), American basketball coach
- A family of Australian basketball players of South Sudanese origin:
  - Thon Maker (born 1997), a forward-center born in South Sudan
  - Matur Maker (born 1998), brother of Thon, also a forward-center born in South Sudan
  - Makur Maker (born 2000), cousin of Thon and Matur, a center born in Kenya
