= Torupill =

Type of bagpipe from Estonia

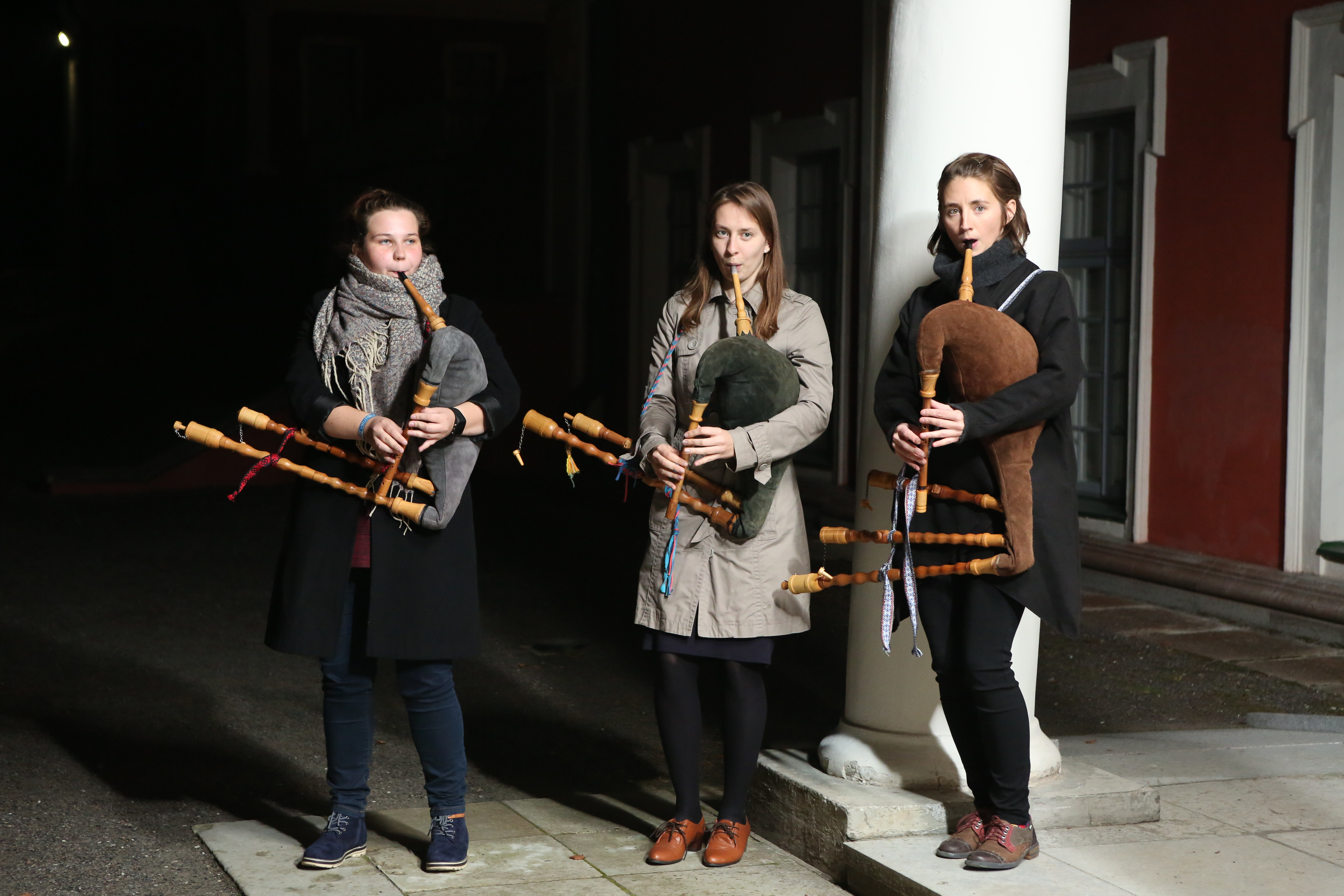
Torupill pipers

The torupill (lit. 'pipe instrument') is a traditional bagpipe from Estonia.

== Place in Estonian folk music ==
It is not clear when the bagpipe became established in Estonia.

The instrument was known throughout Estonia. The bagpipe tradition was longest preserved in West and North Estonia where folk music retained archaic characteristics for a longer time. Later when the fiddle was taking over folk music a lot of bagpipe tunes were transcribed for it.

Very often the bagpipe was used for playing dance music; other instruments served this purpose only in the absence of the bagpipe. Some old ceremonial dances, such as the Round Dance (Voortants) and the Tail Dance (Sabatants) were performed together with a bagpiper who walked at the head of the column. Ceremonial music took an important place in the bagpipers' repertoires in the 17th century, as seen from the literary sources of that time. For instance, the presence of a bagpiper was considered essential during weddings, where he had to take part in certain ceremonies. There were special tunes, marches or riding melodies that were performed in the wedding procession, etc. The bagpiper was an indispensable participant in dances and social gatherings. He accompanied minstrels during Martinmas and Christmas. No pub could manage without a good musician.

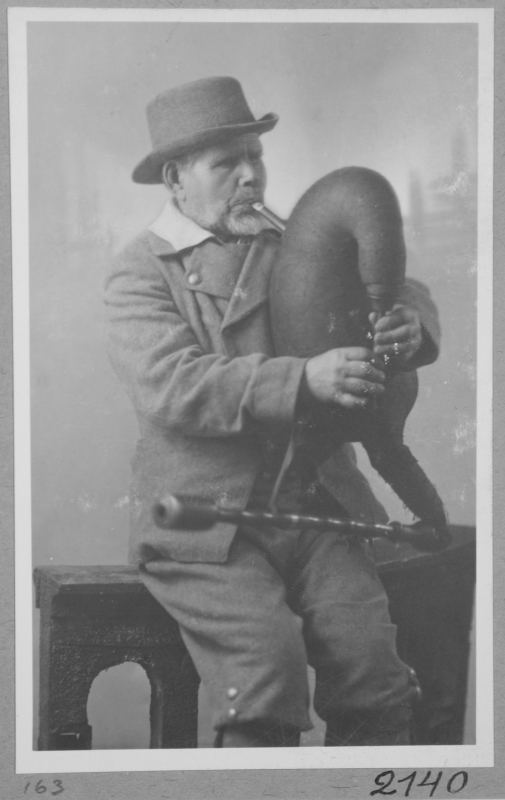
Juhan Maaker, one of the most notable torupill musicians of the 19th and 20th-centuries.

One of the most popular players in history has been considered Juhan Maaker (1845–1930) at the time called the king of bagpipe players in Estonia. Another notable player include his nephew Aleksander Maaker (1890–1968). After Aleksander's death there was only one surviving bagpipe player alive in Estonia: Olev Roomet who became the bagpipe revivalist in Estonia by training 25 new players in the 1970s.

In modern times bagpipe playing is a part of the curriculum at University of Tartu Viljandi Culture Academy's Traditional Music faculty and in a number of regular music schools around the country.

== Construction ==
The Estonian bagpipe has a bag, a mouth-pipe (blow-pipe) for inflating the bag, a melody-pipe (chanter) and 1 or 2, rarely 3, drones.

=== Bag ===
The bag ("tuulekott", "magu", "lõõts", "kott", etc.) was usually made of the stomach of a grey seal in the western and northern parts of Estonia and on the islands. Most valued were the stomachs of large old seals. The bag that was made of a seal's stomach, was not spoilt either by aridity or by humidity. A bagpiper of the Hiiu island is known to have said that if his bagpipe (made of a seal's stomach) became wet, it sounded richer because the seal is a sea animal.

The bags were also made of the stomach of an ox, cow, elk or dog, but sometimes they were sewn of the skin of a dog, cat, goat or seal (with the fur outward) or even of the skin of a Lynx.

In bag-making certain superstitions were observed. In South Estonia, for example, some thought that the more a dog howled when being hanged, the better the sound of the bagpipe later.

=== Blow pipe ===
The blow pipe ("puhumispulk", "naput", "naba", "puhknapp", "napp") was made of wood.

=== Chanter ===
The chanter ("sõrmiline", "putk", "esimik", etc.) was made of juniper, pine, ash or, more seldom, of a tube of cane. It had 5–6 holes. The chanter was single-reeded, generally with a parallel rather than conical bore.

The bottom end of the chanter sometimes had 1 – 2 holes in the side bored obliquely into the pipe, so that some straws or twigs could be put in to control the pitch.

The chanter was placed in an oval wooden stock ("kibu", "kloba", "torupakk", "käsilise pakk"). The stock-end of the chanter contained a reed ("piuk", "keel", "roog", "raag", "vile").

=== Drone ===
The drones ("passitoru", "pass", "kai", "tori", "pill", "pulk", "toro") were made of wooden pipes, different in shape and diameter. The number of pipes determined their length. If there is only one, it is quite long, if two, they are both shorter. In some rare cases bagpipes with 3 drones could be found. The drone consists of 2 – 3 separate joints. In the lower end there is a wooden bell. The joints can be pulled out in order to tune the drone. The drone is placed in an oval or round stock.

== Repertoire ==
Although they can be quite long sometimes (with 3 passages or more), they remain simple in their structure.

The music for the bagpipe has much in common with the melodies of old Estonian so-called runic songs. A number of tunes, like the instrument itself, are of foreign origin. Supposedly they chiefly derive from Sweden. The Swedish influence is suggested by the texts of dance songs for the bagpipe, and the dances themselves also seem to come from Sweden.

From the English translation (by Kustas Tiivas ) of Igor Tõnurist's texts.

== Notable players ==
- Jaakko Lemmetty
- Aleksander Maaker
- Juhan Maaker
- Lauri Õunapuu
- Olev Roomet
- Ants Taul

== See also ==
- Culture of Estonia
