= Olev Roomet =

Estonian musician (1901–1987)

Olev Roomet (13 December 1901 in Simuna - 23 March 1987) was an Estonian musician, a violin player, a player of the torupill (Estonian bagpipe) and a singer in the State Academic Male Choir of Estonia. He became interested in the Estonian bagpipe in his 50s. At the death of Aleksander Maaker in 1968, Roomer became the only living player of the torupill at that time.

In the wake of the traditional Estonian Song and Dance Festival in 1970 Olev Roomet revived the ancient art of bagpipe playing in Estonia by training 25 new bagpipers ranging between age of 14 to 70. Voldemar Süda, a master of musical instruments made the new bagpipes following authentic ethnographic examples.
