= Käina Parish =

Former municipality of Estonia

Coordinates: 58°49′32″N 22°47′22″E

Käina Parish Käina vald
- Former municipality of Estonia
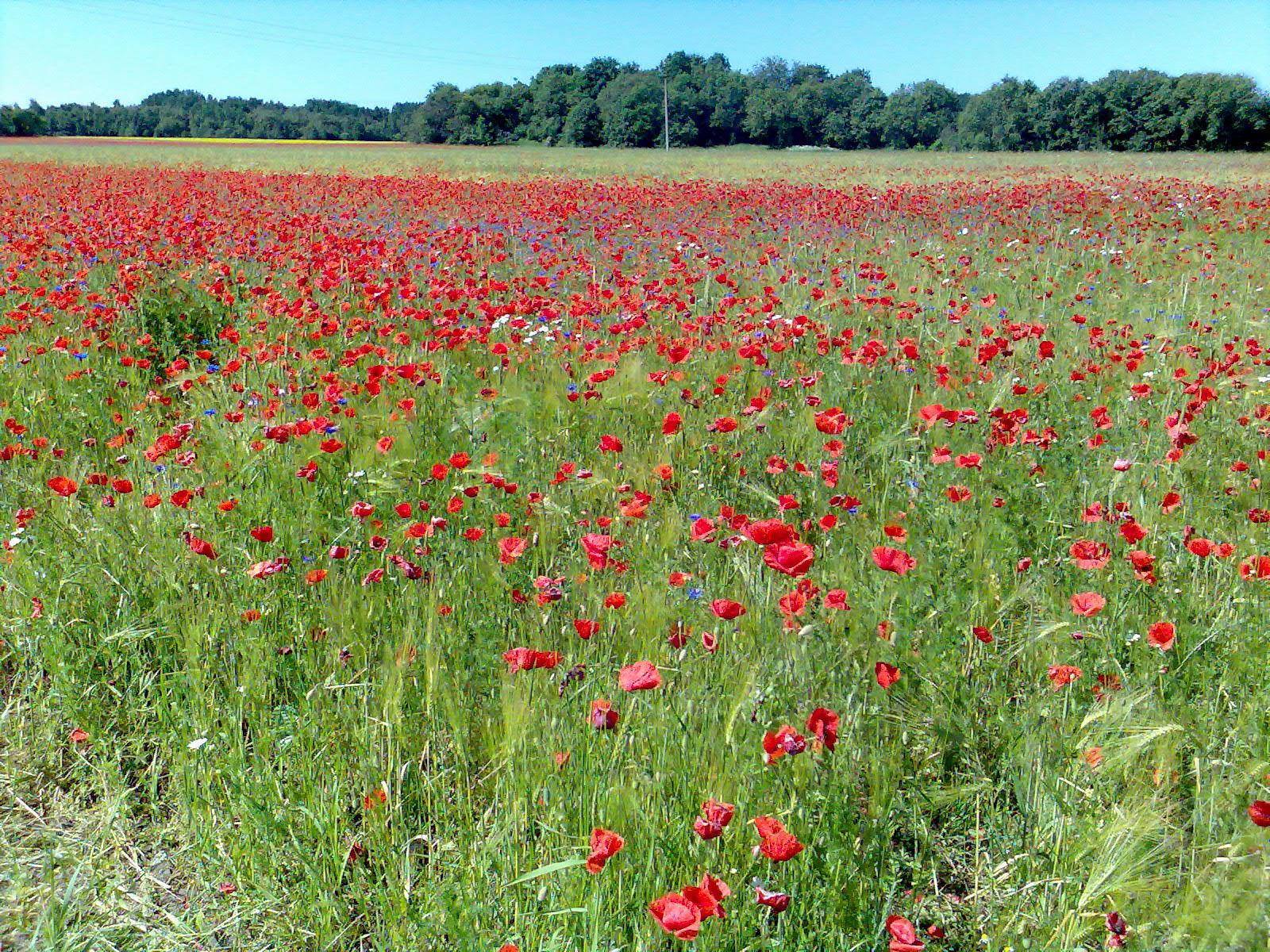

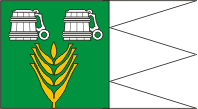
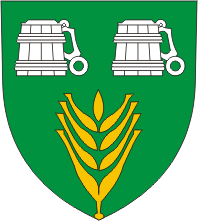
- Flag Coat of arms

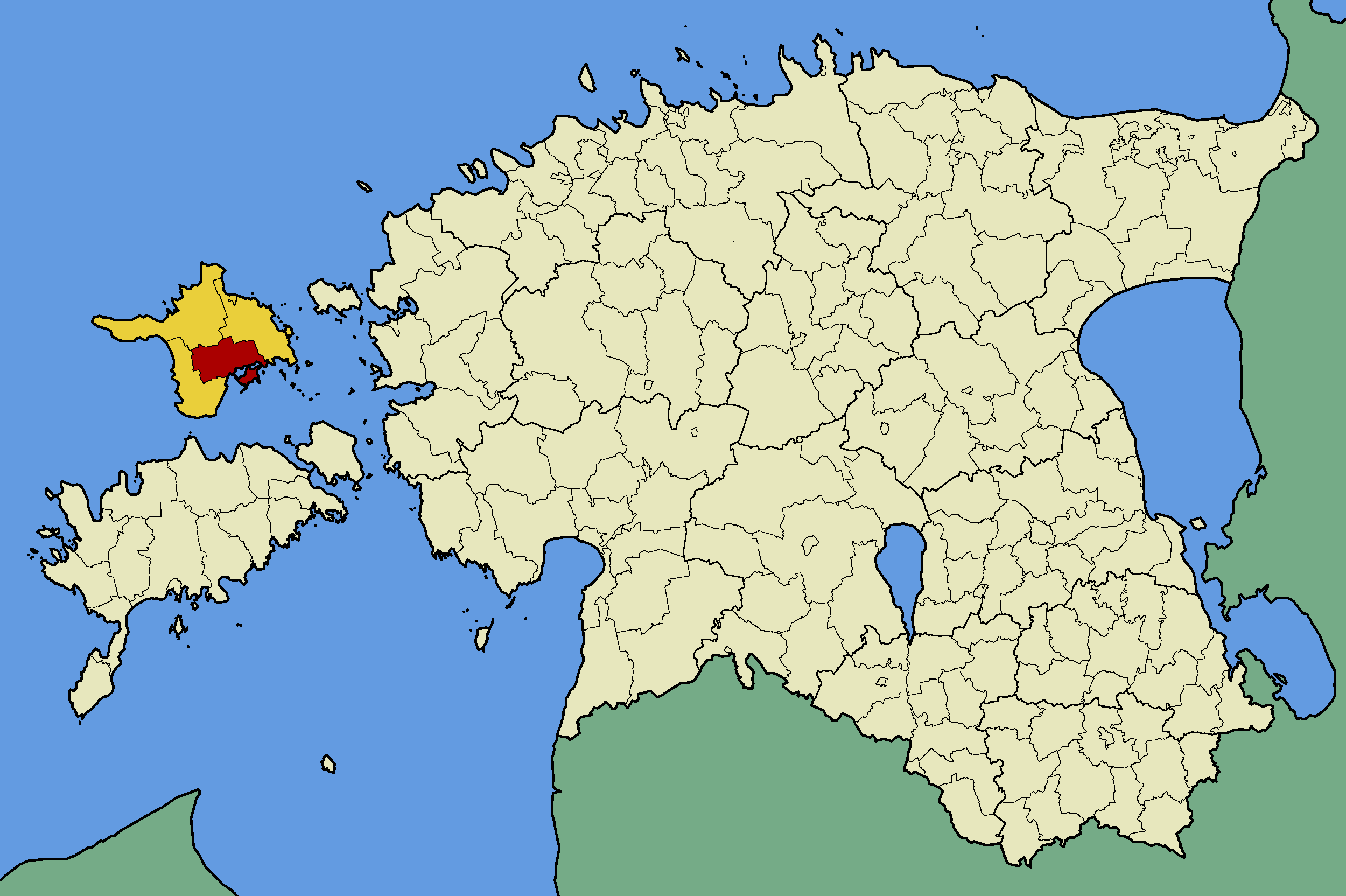
- Käina Parish within Hiiu County.
- Country: Estonia
- County: Hiiu County
- Administrative centre: Käina

Area
  - Total: 186 km^{2} (72 sq mi)

Population (01.01.2006)
  - Total: 2,180
  - Density: 11.7/km^{2} (30.4/sq mi)
- Website: www.kaina.hiiumaa.ee

Käina Parish was a rural municipality of Hiiu County, Estonia on the southeastern part of the island.

== Settlements ==
There was 1 small borough (alevik) Käina and 34 villages: Aadma, Allika, Esiküla, Jõeküla, Kaasiku, Kaigutsi, Kassari, Kleemu, Kogri, Kolga, Kuriste, Laheküla, Lelu, Ligema, Luguse, Mäeküla, Mäeltse, Männamaa, Moka, Nasva, Niidiküla, Nõmme, Nõmmerga, Orjaku, Pärnselja, Putkaste, Ristivälja, Selja, Taguküla, Taterma, Ühtri, Utu, Vaemla, Villemi.
