= Valk =

Family name

Valk is a surname. It means "falcon" in Dutch and can be of metonymic origin referring to a falconer. Alternatively, it can be patronymic, son of Falk/Falco, a West Frisian given name. There were 4380 people with the surname in the Netherlands in 2007. The name Valk in Estonia (895 people) may be related to the town Valka.

== Geographical distribution ==
As of 2014, 61.8% of all known bearers of the surname Valk were residents of the Netherlands (frequency 1:3,165), 14.3% of the United States (1:292,986), 8.7% of Estonia (1:1,758), 3.5% of Germany (1:268,323), 1.8% of Canada (1:243,695), 1.7% of Brazil (1:1,372,565), 1.3% of Russia (1:1,222,807), 1.3% of Australia (1:214,179), 1.3% of New Zealand (1:41,921) and 1.0% of France (1:791,757).

In the Netherlands, the frequency of the surname was higher than national average (1:3,165) in the following provinces:

1. Overijssel (1:1,950)
2. South Holland (1:2,187)
3. Friesland (1:2,277)
4. North Holland (1:3,163)

== People ==
- Aune Valk (born 1972), Estonian psychologist
- Curtis Valk (born 1993), Canadian ice hockey player
- E. M. Valk-Heijnsdijk (1867–1945), Dutch cookbook writer and restaurateur
- Frederick Valk (1895–1956), German actor
- Garry Valk (born 1967), Canadian ice hockey player
- Heiki Valk (born 1959), Estonian archaeologist
- Heinz Valk (born 1936), Estonian artist, caricaturist and politician
- Henry S. Valk (born 1929), American physicist
- John Valk, Canadian philosophy scholar
- Kate Valk (born 1956), American artist
- Mall Valk (1935–1976), Estonian ceramist
- Mats Valk (born 1996), Dutch Rubik's cube speedsolver
- Ria Valk (born 1941), Dutch singer
- Rüdiger Valk (born 1945), German mathematician
- Veronika Valk (born 1976), Estonian architect
- William Valk (1806–1879), American Civil War surgeon and politician

== See also ==
- Valka
- Van der Valk
- Pieter de Valk (1584–1625), Dutch Golden Age painter
