= Käina =

Borough in Estonia

- Small borough
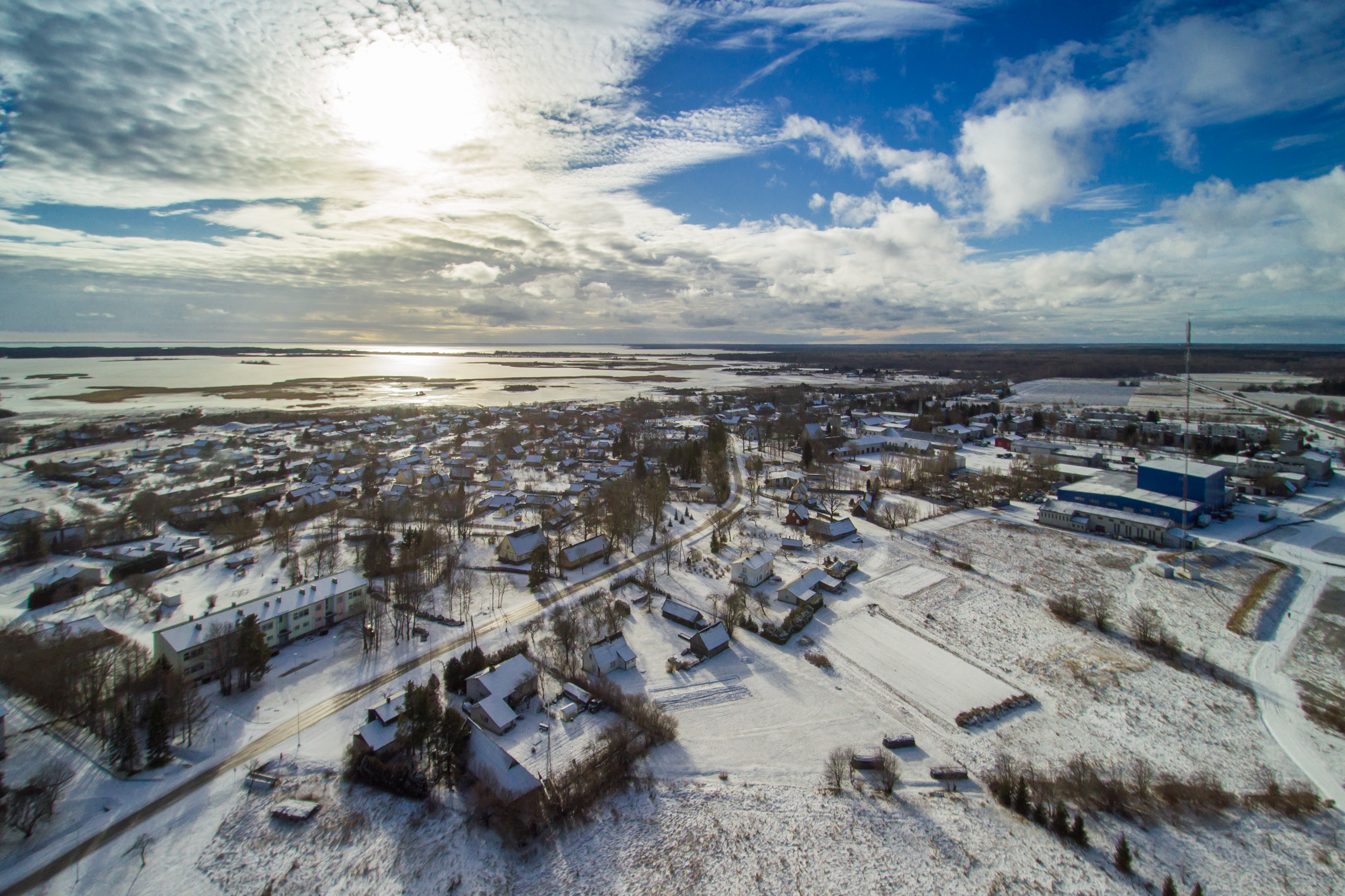
- Aerial view of Käina

- Location within Estonia
- Coordinates: 58°49′38″N 22°46′36″E
- Country: Estonia
- County: Hiiu County
- Parish: Hiiumaa Parish

Population
  - Total: 711
- Time zone: UTC+2 (EET)
  - Summer (DST): UTC+3 (EEST)

Käina (German: Keinis) is a small borough (alevik) in Hiiu County on the island of Hiiumaa in Estonia, located near the north shore of Käina Bay. Prior to the administrative reform of Estonian municipalities in 2017, Käina was the administrative center of Käina Parish.

== Notable people ==
- Endel Kiisa (1937-2024), motorcycle racer
- Ada Lundver (1942–2011), actress, singer
- Elmar Tampõld (1920-2013), Estonian-Canadian architect, was born in Käina
- Rudolf Tobias (1873–1918), composer, was born and lived in a house just west of Käina in nowadays Selja village.

== Gallery ==
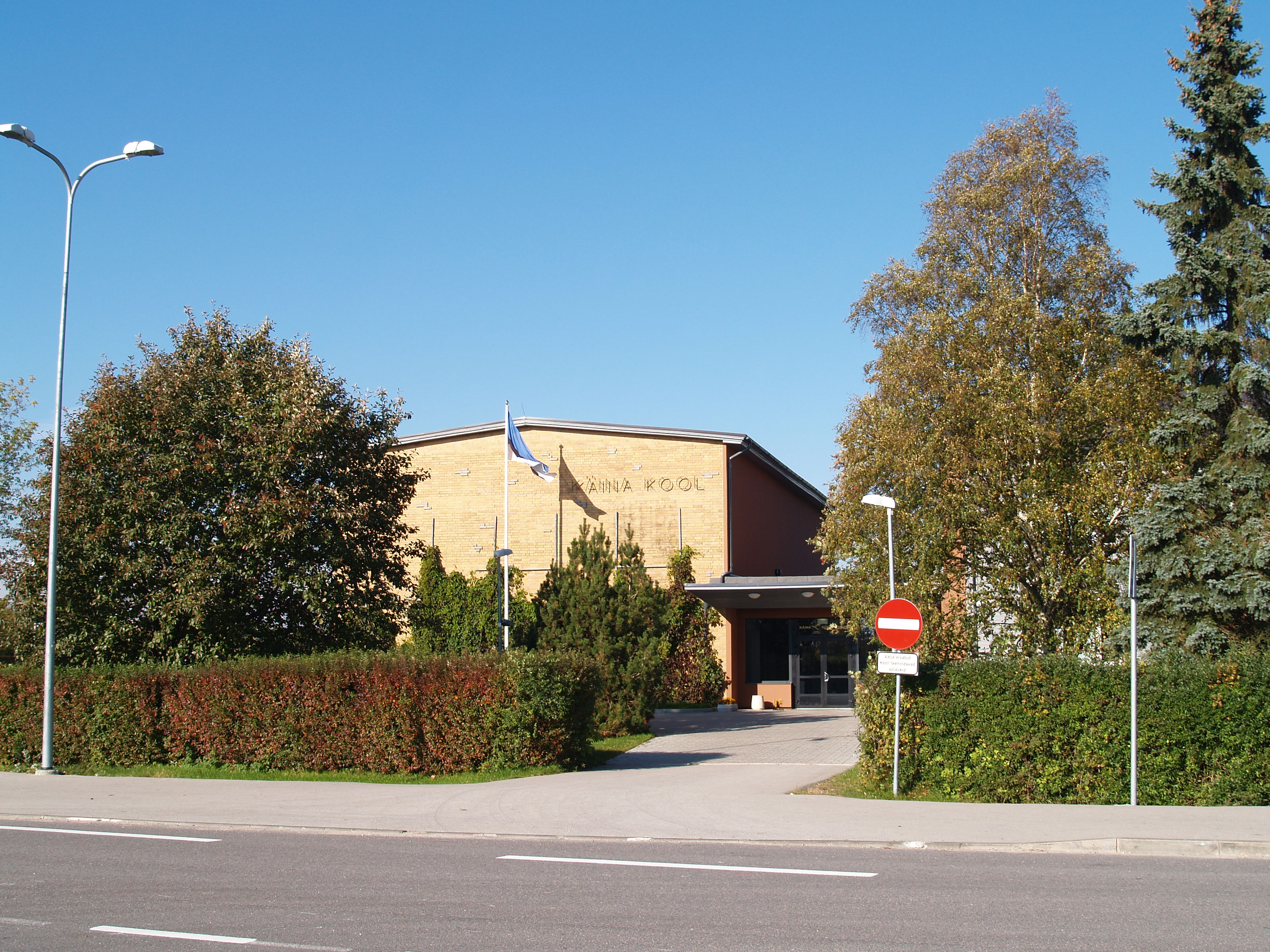
Käina School

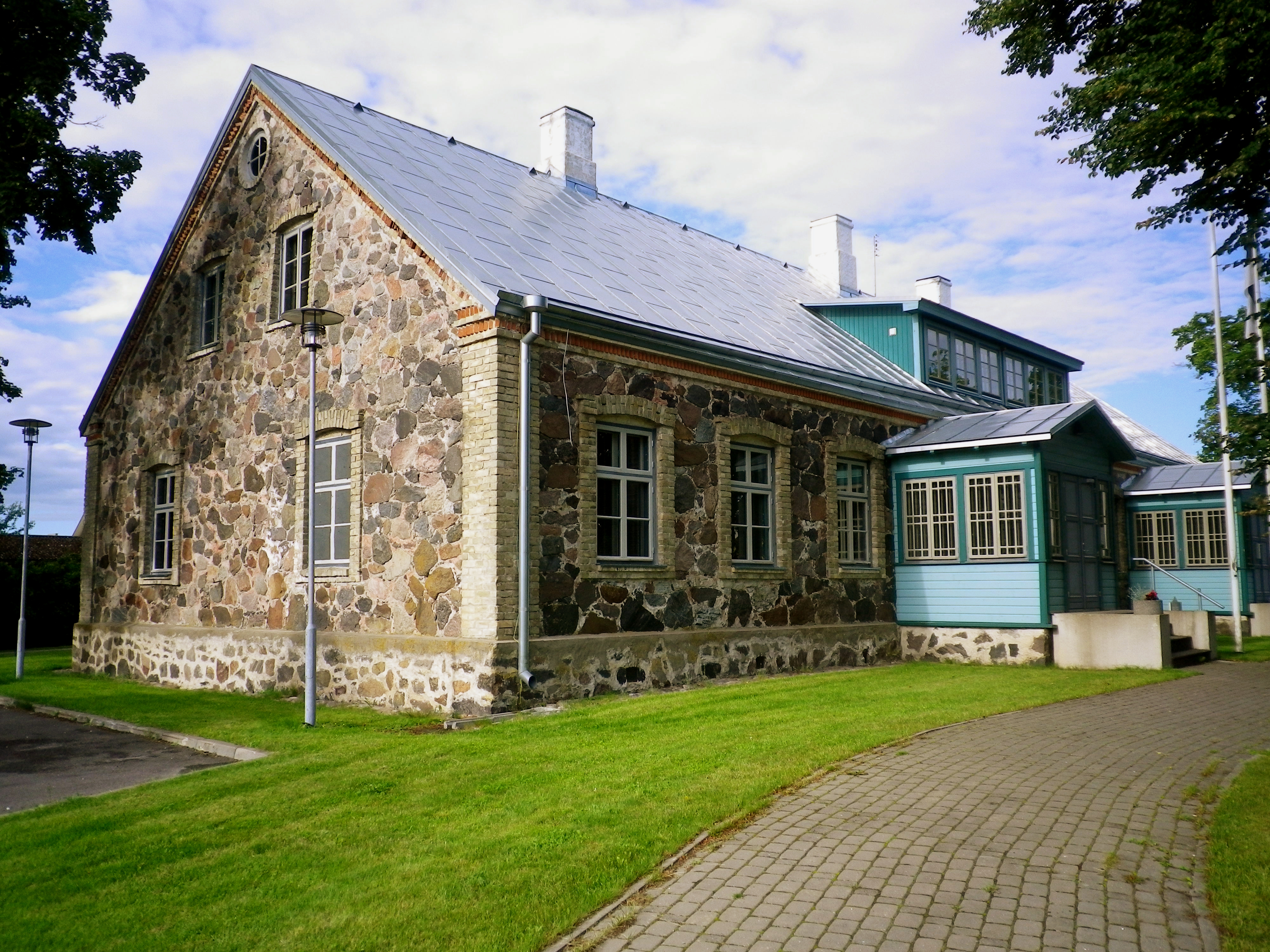
Käina community center

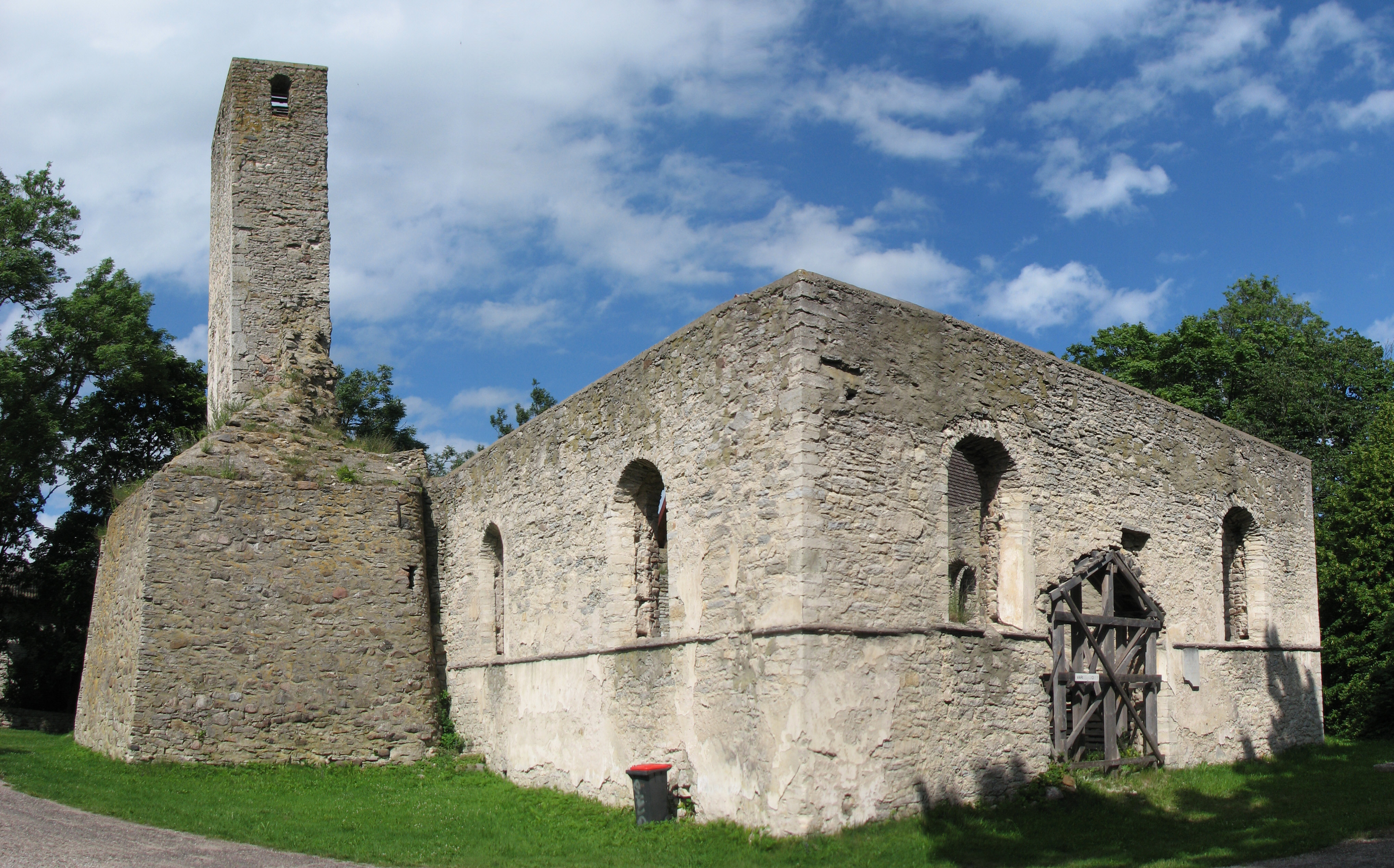
Käina St. Martin's Church ruins
