= Lake Tihu =

Lake in Estonia

- Tihu järv (Estonian)
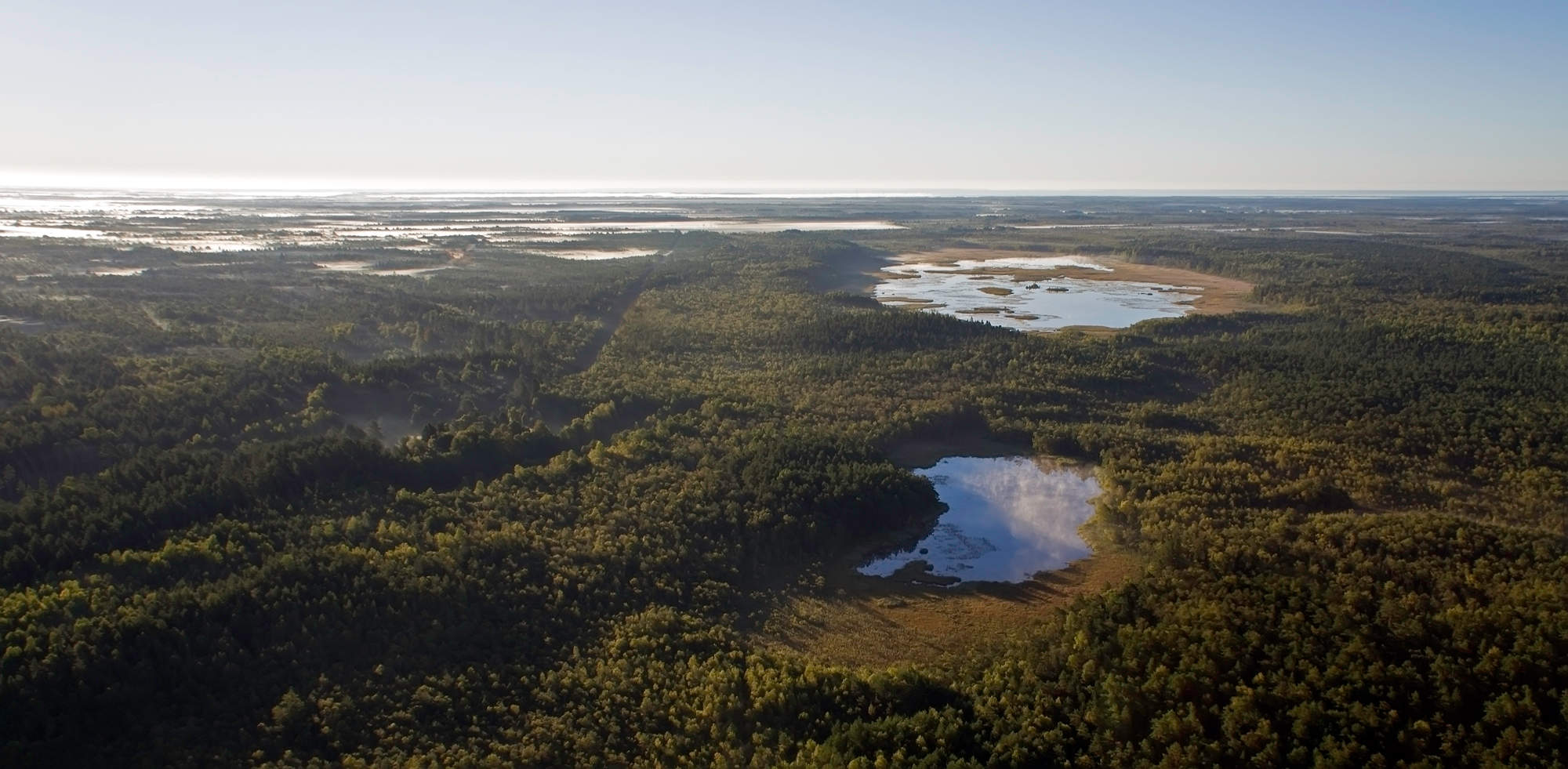

- Location within Estonia
- Location: Käina Parish, Hiiumaa, Estonia
- Coordinates: 58°51′10″N 22°33′30″E
- Basin countries: Estonia
- Max. length: 1,650 meters (5,410 ft)
- Surface area: 48.6 hectares (120 acres)
- Max. depth: 0.2 meters (7.9 in)
- Shore length^{1}: 9,120 meters (29,920 ft)
- Surface elevation: 14.2 meters (47 ft)
- Islands: 17
- ^{1} Shore length is not a well-defined measure.

Lake Tihu (Estonian: Tihu järv, also Tihu Suurjärv, Tihu Esimene järv, Männamaa järv, Esimene järv, or Suurjärv) is a lake in Estonia. It is located in the village of Männamaa in Hiiumaa Parish, Hiiu County.

== Physical description ==
The lake has an area of 48.6 hectares (120 acres), and it has 17 islands with a combined area of 1.6 hectares (4.0 acres). The lake has a maximum depth of 0.2 meters (7.9 in). It is 1,650 meters (5,410 ft) long, and its shoreline measures 9,120 meters (29,920 ft).

== See also ==
- List of lakes of Estonia
