= Sooster =

Sooster is an Estonian surname. Notable people with the surname include:

- Mall Sooster, birth name of Mall Valk (1935–1976), Estonian ceramist
- Ülo Sooster (1924–1970), Estonian painter
