= Nasva =

Nasva may refer to:

- Nasva, Hiiu County, a village in Hiiu County, Estonia
- Nasva, Saare County, a small borough in Saare County, Estonia
- Nasva, Russia, a rural locality (a village) in Novosokolnichesky District of Pskov Oblast, Russia
- Nasva (stream), a stream in Saare County, Estonia
- NASVA: National agency for Automotive Safety & Victims´Aid a Japanese program for car safety (see es:Nasva)
