= Des Jona Sendung =

1907 oratorio by Rudolf Tobias

Des Jona Sendung (Estonian: Joonase lähetamine; 'Jonah's Mission') is an oratorium composed in 1907–1909 by Estonian composer Rudolf Tobias. The oratorium's text is taken from the Bible.

The premiere of a version using reduced orchestral forces took place on 26 November 1909, in Leipzig's St. Andreas Church, conducted by Rudolf Tobias himself. The premiere of the full, restored version took place in Estonia and was conducted by Peeter Lilje on 25 May 1989 in the Estonia Concert Hall.

The premiere recording was released in 1995 as a two CD set on the BIS Records label, featuring Neeme Järvi conducting the Estonian State Symphony Orchestra.
