= Eye in the Egg =

1962 painting by Ülo Sooster

- Artist: Ülo Sooster
- Year: 1962
- Type: oil on paper
- Dimensions: 75.0 cm × 109.5 cm (29.5 in × 43.1 in)
- Location: Tartu Art Museum, Tartu

Eye in the Egg (Estonian: Silm munas) is a 1962 oil on paper painting by the Estonian artist Ülo Sooster in the Tartu Art Museum.

This painting shows an abstract egg-shaped form that opens into an infinite number of such opened-egg-shaped forms. It was painted in the period after the artist was released from 7 years hard labor in a Soviet prison camp when he was living in Moscow on Sretensky Boulevard with several other artists then painting and working in the non-conformist style.

Sooster was experimenting at that time with motifs of the egg taken from René Magritte, and they symbolized for him infinity, evolution, and the experience of timelessness. There were so many repetitions of the egg in later works by Sooster that his grave has a stone egg on it. On 1 December 1962 this work was shown in Moscow in an exhibition at Moscow Manege, hoping to gain Soviet recognition for their modernist art, but which sadly backfired, with the exhibitors receiving an angry reprimand from Khrushchev.

The edges of the egg shapes are contoured to look almost as if made in metal in a trompe-l'œil effect.
