= Allika, Hiiu County =

Village in Estonia

Allika
- Village
- Location within Estonia
- Coordinates: 58°50′31″N 22°46′59″E
- Country: Estonia
- County: Hiiu County
- Parish: Hiiumaa Parish
- Time zone: UTC+2 (EET)
  - Summer (DST): UTC+3 (EEST)

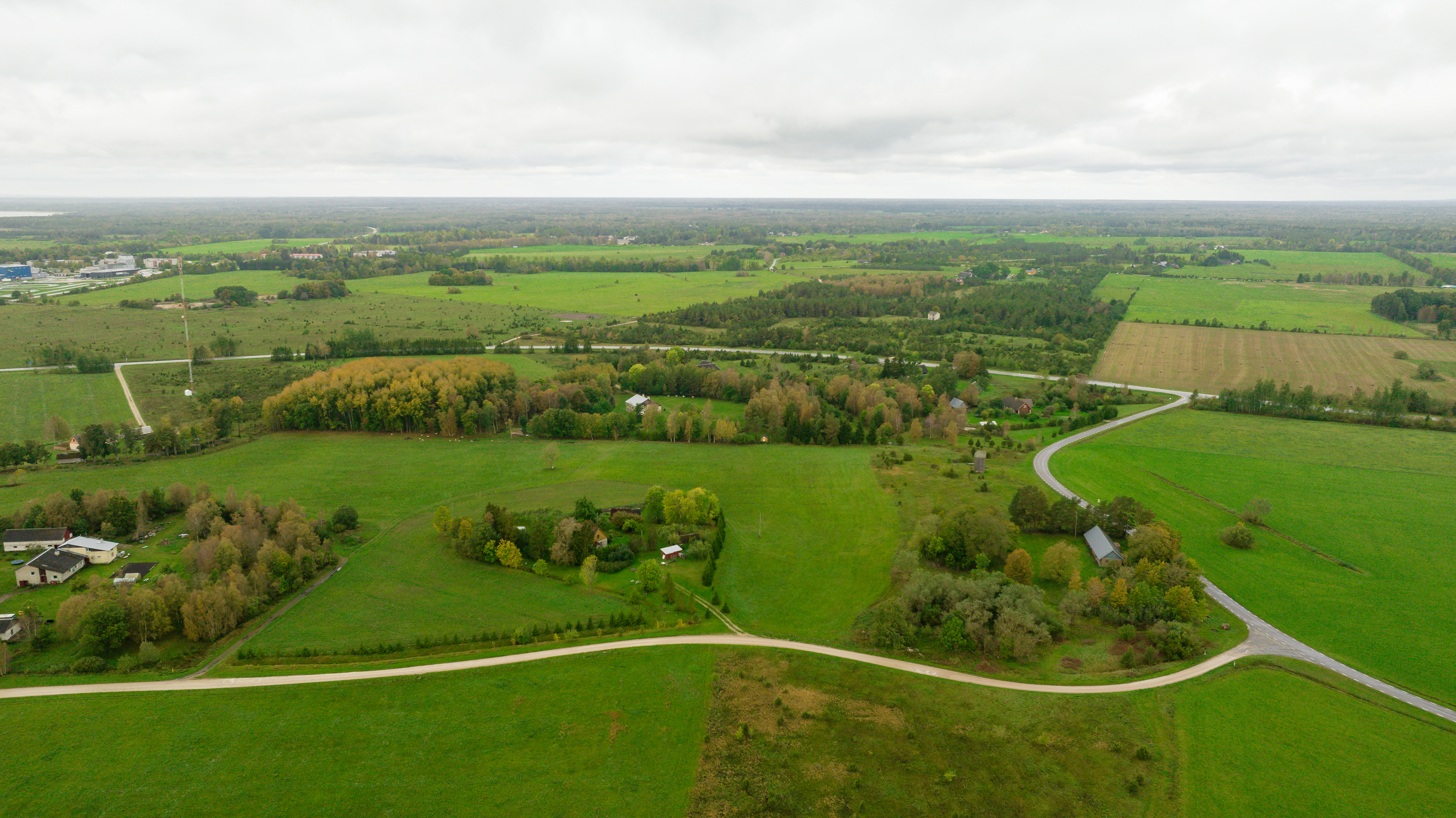

Allika is a village in Hiiumaa Parish, Hiiu County in northwestern Estonia.

The village was first mentioned in 1620 (Hallikio by).

In the 1970s, the village was divided into two: western part was named Allika I, and the eastern part Allika II. In 1977, Allika I was merged into the village of Moka, and Allika II into the (former) village of Vaku. In 1997, the pre-1970s situation was restored.
