= Ülo Sooster =

Estonian painter (1924–1970)

- Born: 17 October 1924; Ühtri, Käina Parish, Hiiumaa, Estonia
- Died: 25 October 1970 (aged 46); Moscow, Russian SFSR, Soviet Union
- Education: Tartu Art College
- Known for: Painting
- Movement: Modernism; Soviet Nonconformist Art
- Website: https://sooster.ee

Ülo Ilmar Sooster (October 17, 1924 in Ühtri, Käina Parish – October 25, 1970 in Moscow) was an Estonian nonconformist painter.

Ülo Sooster was born the village of Ühtri on the Estonian island of Hiiumaa. He was the son of Johannes Sooster and Veera Sooster (née Tatter) and had a sister, Meedi, two years younger. His father was later remarried to Linda Vahtras. He was the cousin of the ceramist Mall Valk (née Sooster). He was educated at Tartu Art College, where he studied surrealism from 1945 to 1949. In 1949, his studies were cut short when he was arrested and, like hundreds of thousands of other Estonians, Latvians, and Lithuanians, he was deported by the Soviet authorities to the Gulag. Sooster was sentenced to ten years of hard labour at the Karaganda camp. In 1956, during the Khrushchev Thaw, he was released and 'rehabilitated' by denouncing Stalinism. He returned to Estonia in 1956, but in 1957 he went to Moscow, and began intensive practice as non-conformist artist.

In 1962, he exhibited his work Eye in the Egg at the Moscow Manege exhibition that turned out to become a barrier for the official acceptance of modern art: the exhibitors received an angry reprimand from Soviet leader Nikita Khrushchev. Ülo Sooster was one of several artists, to whom Khruschev addressed directly. Sooster's widow narrated:

"Khrushchev walked around the room, went up to Yulo's blue painting and asked: "What is this?" "A lunar landscape," Yulo answered. "Have you been there, asshole?" Khrushchev began to yell wildly. And Yulo answered: "That's how I imagine it." "I'll send you to the West, formalist, no, no, I'll deport you, no, I'll send you to a camp!" Khrushchev continued to rage. And Yulo answered: "I've already been there." Then Khrushchev said that no, he wouldn't deport him, but he would re-educate him."

Sooster worked with Ilya Kabakov who wrote a monograph of Sooster's work which Kabakov kept throughout the Soviet period and which Kabakov finally published years later in 1996 after emigrating to New York.

== Personal life ==
Ülo Sooster married Lidia Serh in 1956. Their son, Tenno-Pent Sooster, was born in 1957 and went on to become an artist.

== Exhibitions ==
- 1966 : Poland, XIX Festiwal Sztuk Plastycznych, Sopot – Poznań: Biura wystaw artystycznych.
