= Rudolf Tobias =

Estonian composer

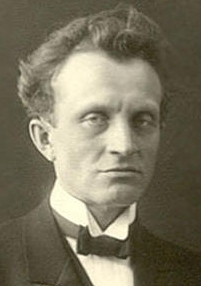
- Born: 29 May 1873; Selja, Kreis Wiek, Governorate of Estonia, Russian Empire
- Died: 29 October 1918 (aged 45); Berlin, German Empire
- Resting place: Kullamaa
- Occupation: Composer
- Era: Romantic
- Spouse: Louise Vilde (m. 1902)
- Children: Johannes Tobias; Paul-Ferdinand Tobias; Sylvia Tobias; Beatrice Tobias; Helen Tobias-Duesberg

Rudolf Tobias (29 May [O.S. 17 May] 1873 – 29 October 1918) was the first Estonian professional composer, as well as a professional organist. He studied at the Saint Petersburg Conservatory. His compositions include among others piano works, string quartets and an oratorio, Des Jona Sendung (Jonah's Mission) (1908, revised and premiered 1909, later reconstructed by Vardo Rumessen).

== Early life ==
Rudolf Tobias was born in Selja, Käina Parish, on the island of Hiiumaa. He was the son of local parish clerk Johannes Tobias and his wife Emilie. Tobias received his first musical training from his father. Under his father's tutelage, he began musical training at an early age and composing his first composition exercises from 1882 when he was 9 years old. In 1885 he entered the Haapsalu school and studied piano under Catharina von Gernet, a local pianist. After he graduated, Tobias moved with his parents to Kullamaa, where his father had become the parish clerk. In 1889 Tobias entered Tallinn Nicolai High School, where he passed the tutor's exam and studied both organ and music theory with Ernst Reinicke, the Tallinn Cathedral organist.

In 1893 Tobias furthered his studies at the Saint Petersburg Conservatory, where he studied organ with Louis Homilius and composition with Nikolai Rimski-Korsakov. In 1897 Tobias graduated from conservatory with two special subjects, presenting as his graduate work the cantata "Johannes Damascenus". After graduation Tobias worked as organist and choir conductor of the Saint Petersburg Estonian St. John's Church from 1898 to 1904. During this time he also performed there his own compositions.

== Career ==
In 1904 Tobias moved to Tartu and worked as a music teacher in numerous schools and also worked as a tutor. During his time in Tartu he participated in organizing concerts, as well as performing as pianist, conductor and organist and preparing with his contemporary Aleksander Läte performances of oratorios. Tobias also began working as a musical journalist during this period and joined the literary group Noor Eesti.

In January 1908 Tobias briefly moved to Paris, France. Shortly after that he lived briefly in Munich and Dresden in Germany and Prague and Dubí in present-day Czech Republic. At the end of 1908 he moved to Leipzig.

In 1910 Tobias moved to Berlin, where he worked as both an organist and journalist. In 1911 he was an active member of the evaluation committee of the Consortium of German Composers (Genossenschaft Deutscher Tonsetzer). In 1914 he acquired German citizenship, and then full professorship at the Royal Academy of Music.

In August 1913 Tobias visited his homeland to view opening ceremonies of the new Estonia Theatre, where he also conducted his own compositions. After returning to Berlin, Tobias arranged his authorship concert where passages of his oratorio "Mission of Jonah" were performed. After the outbreak of World War I Tobias was enrolled in the German army where he worked as an interpreter. Tobias was released from service for medical reasons in 1916 and he returned to work in the Royal Academy of Music.

== Death and legacy ==
Tobias died of pneumonia in Berlin, Germany, on 29 October 1918. His youngest daughter, Helen, born seven months after his death, also became a composer. He was buried in the Friedhof Wilmersdorf cemetery in Berlin. After the restoration of the Republic of Estonia, Tobias's remains were reburied on 7 June 1992 in Kullamaa.

In commemoration of Rudolf Tobias' life and work, a monument was erected in Haapsalu in 1929 designed by architect Roman Haavamägi and a memorial erected in Kullamaa in 1973. In 1924 a street in Tallinn's Raua subdistrict was renamed after Tobias and in 1973 Tobias's name was given to the Children's Music School in Kärdla. On the occasion of the centennial of Tobias's birth in 1973, a memorial museum was opened in Selja, Käina Parish in the house where he was born.

Rudolf Tobias was engraved on the front side of the Estonian 50 krooni bill used between 1994 and 2010.

The Tobias String Quartet (Tobiase keelpillikvartett) is named after this composer.

== Gallery ==
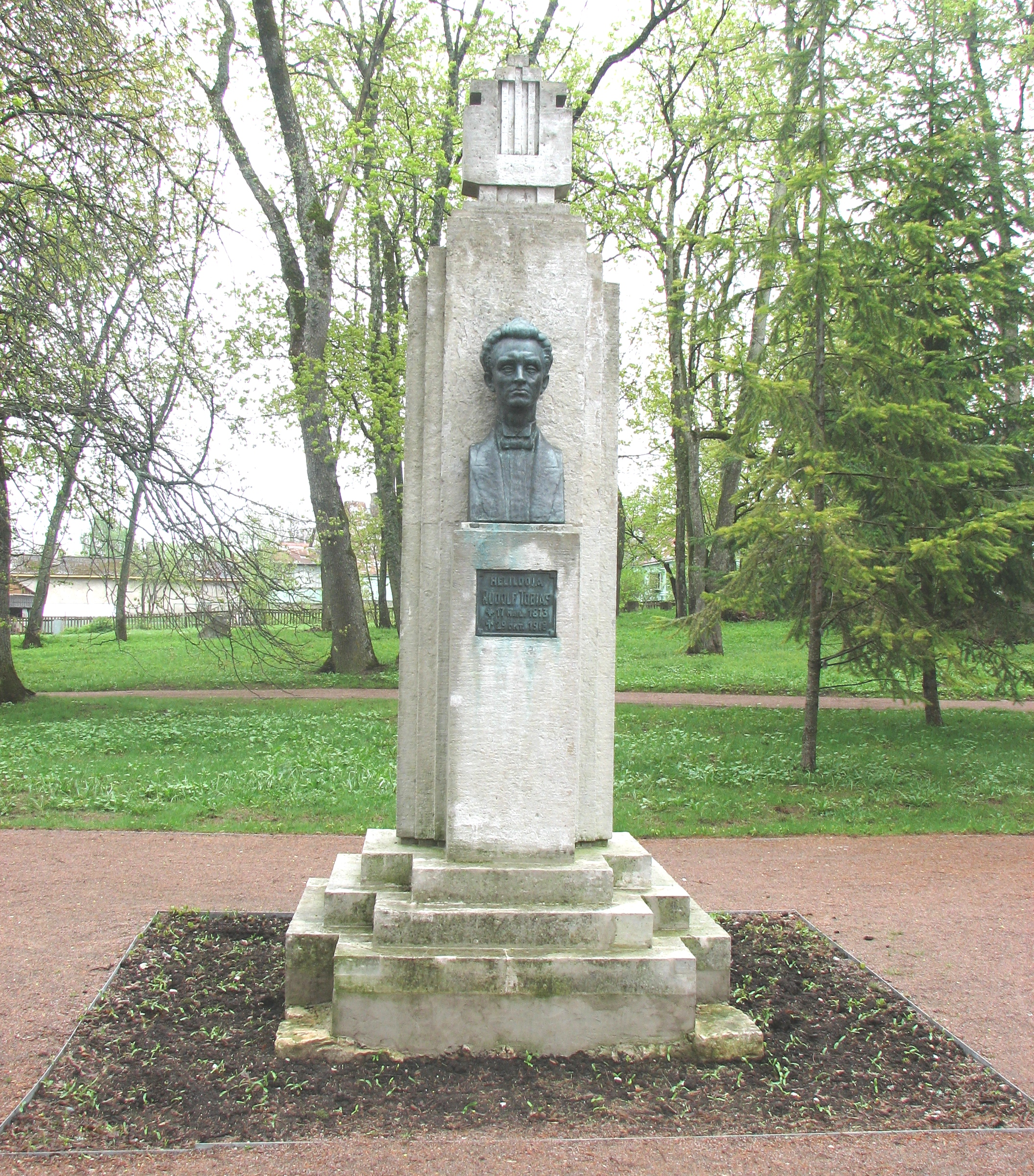
Monument to Tobias in Haapsalu.

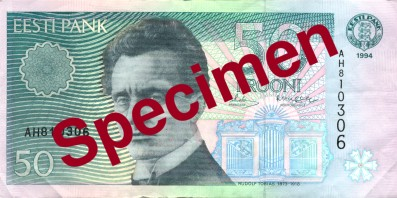
Tobias on the Estonian 50 krooni bill.

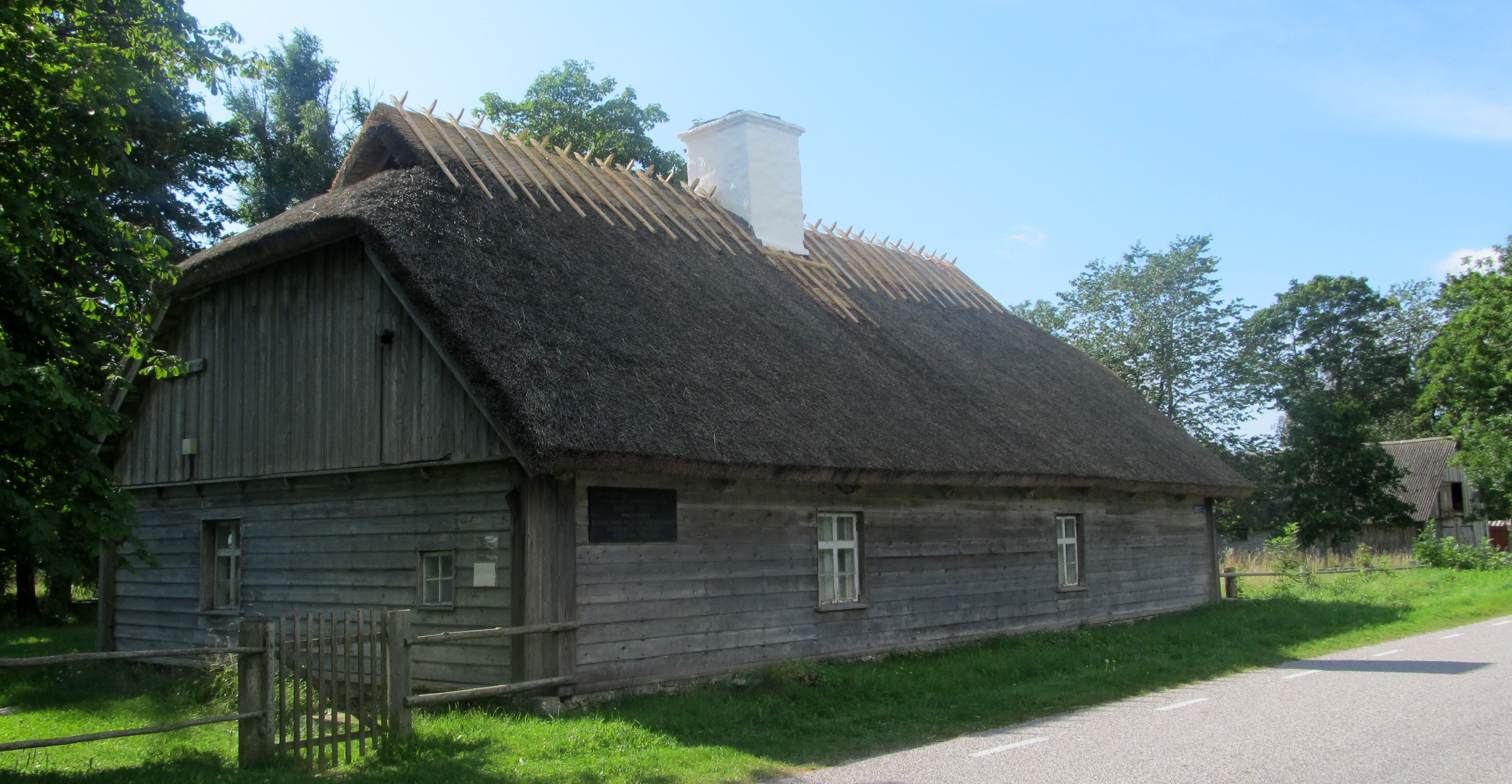
Rudolf Tobias' Museum at his birth house in Selja, Käina Parish.

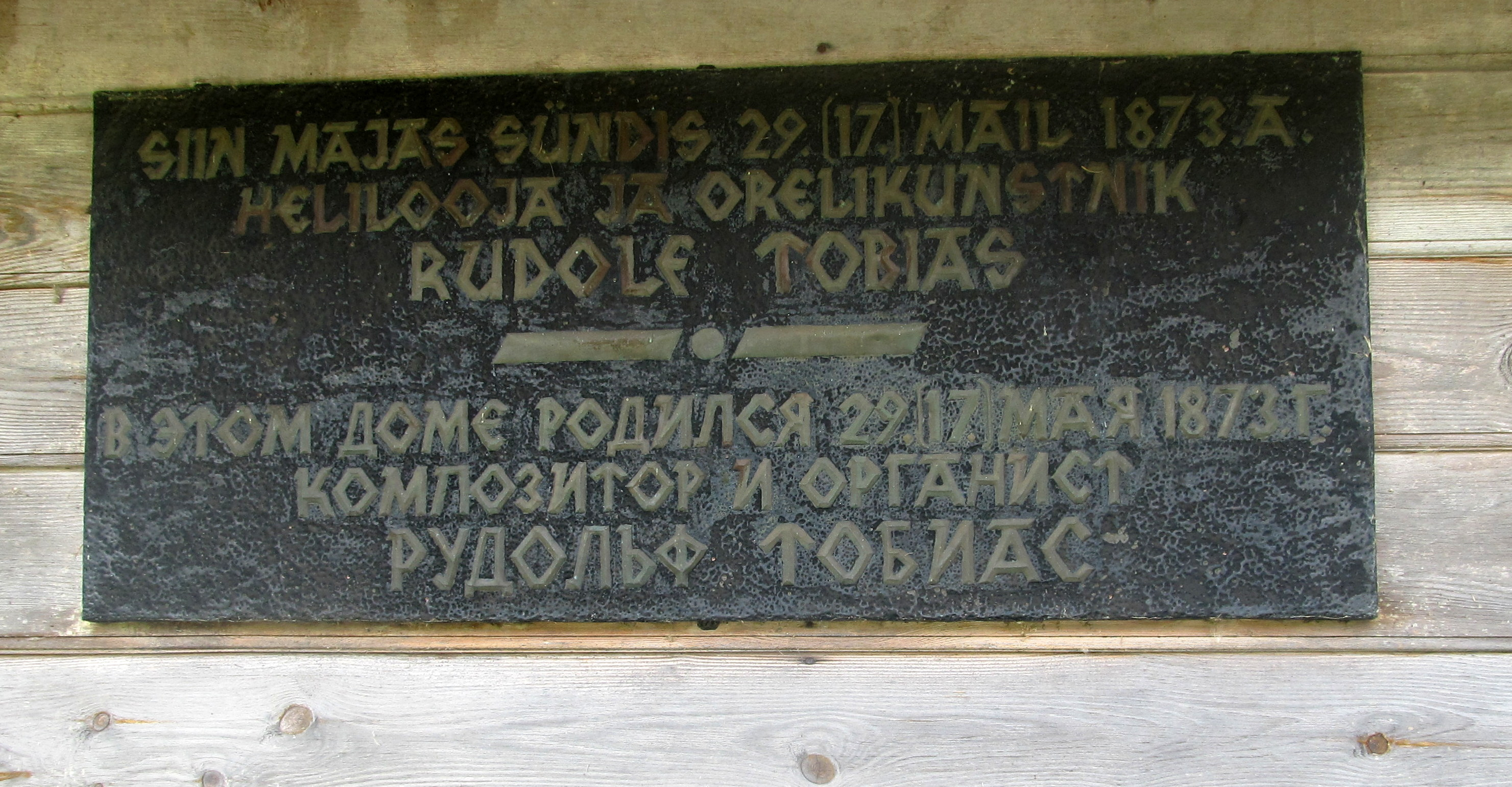
Plaque in the museum.
