= Van der Valk (disambiguation) =

Van der Valk was a 1972 British TV series based on a character created by British author Nicolas Freeling

Van der Valk, Van der Valck, Vandervalk or De Valk may also refer to:

- Van der Valk (2020 TV series), a British remake of the 1972 series
- Van der Valk (company), Dutch hospitality chain

== People with the surname ==
- Charlotte Vandervalk (born 1937), American politician
- Guido van der Valk (born 1980), Dutch golfer
- Kirsten van der Valk (born 1994), Dutch badminton player
- Leonardus Cornelius van der Valck (1769–1845), Dutch diplomat and mysterious count in Germany
- Marchinus van der Valk (1910–1992), Dutch pastor and classical scholar
- Pieter de Valk (1584–1625), Dutch Golden Age painter
- Vasco van der Valk (born 1999), Dutch motorcycle road racer

== Arts and entertainment ==
=== Fictional characters ===
- Simon "Piet" van der Valk, fictional Dutch detective in the Van der Valk novels (1962–1989) by Nicolas Freeling
