= Ühtri =

Village in Estonia

- Village
- Location within Estonia
- Coordinates: 58°49′N 22°40′E
- Country: Estonia
- County: Hiiu County
- Parish: Hiiumaa Parish
- Time zone: UTC+2 (EET)
  - Summer (DST): UTC+3 (EEST)

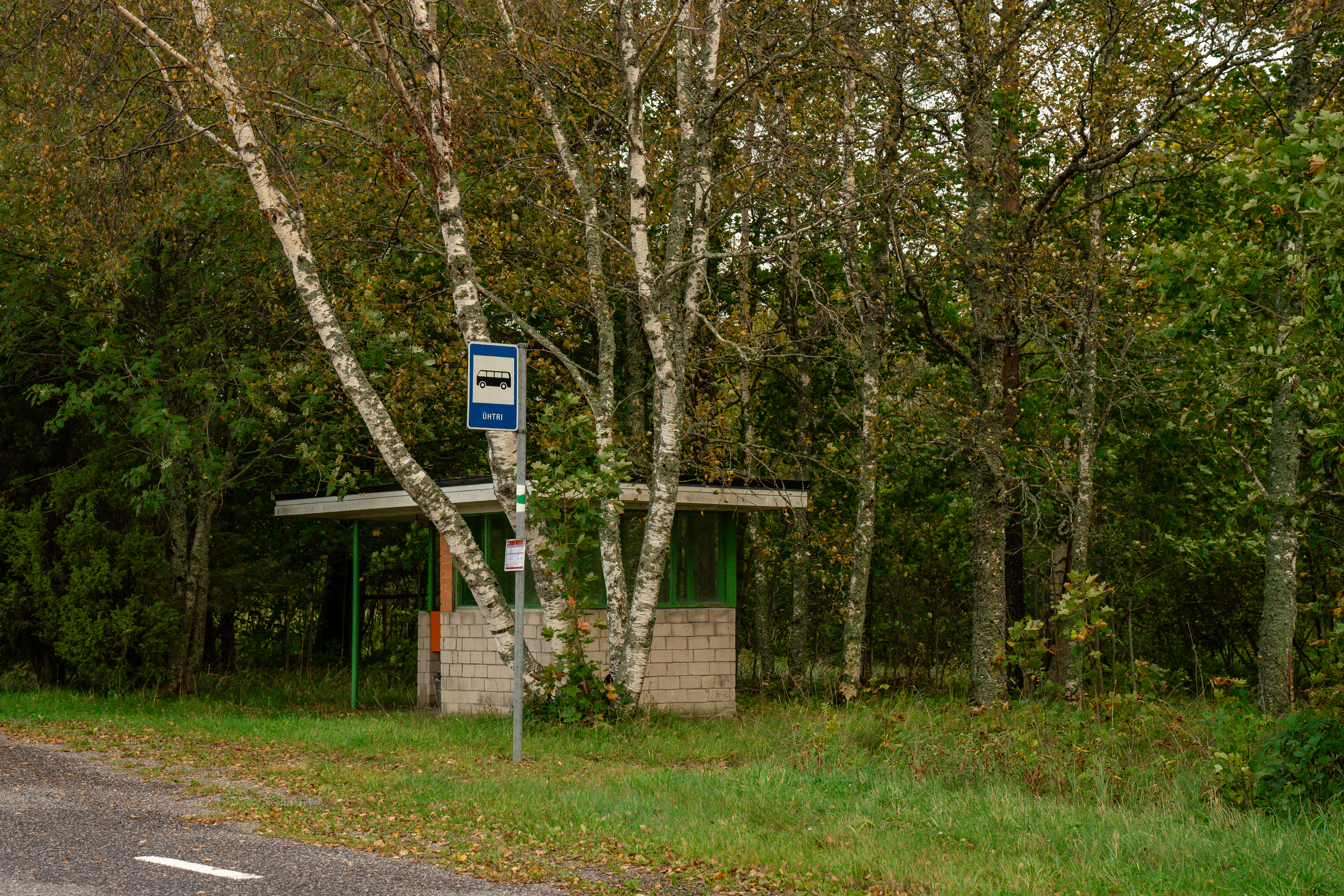
Ühtri, a village in Hiiumaa Rural Municipality, Hiiu County, Estonia

Ühtri is a village in Hiiumaa Parish, Hiiu County in northwestern Estonia.

== Notable people ==
Notable people that were born or lived in Ühtri include the following:

- Ülo Sooster (1924–1970), painter, born in Ühtri
- Mall Valk (1935–1976), ceramist, born in Ühtri
