= Putkaste, Hiiu County =

Village in Estonia

Putkaste
- Village
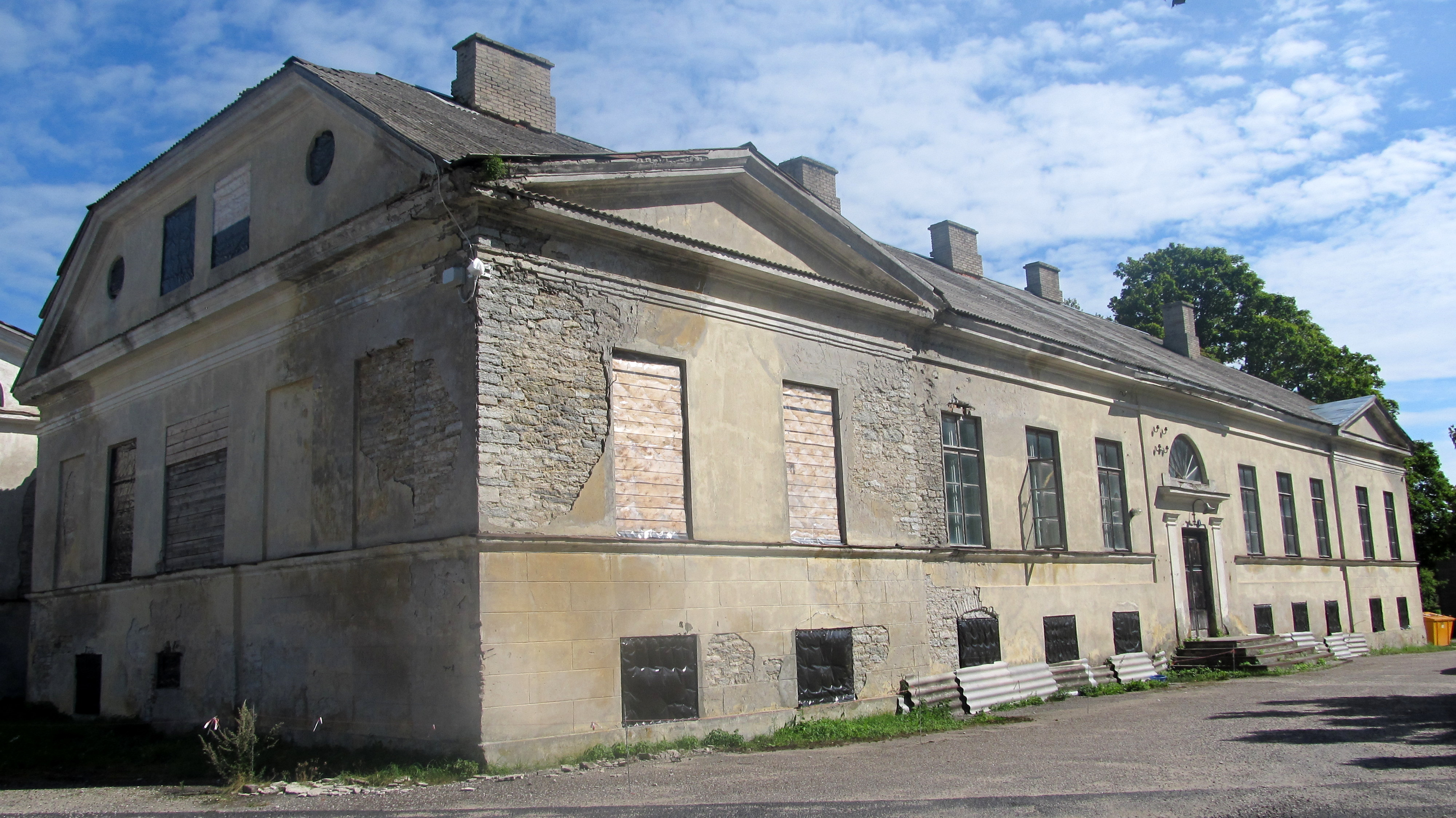
- Manor in Putkaste

- Location within Estonia
- Coordinates: 58°50′14″N 22°47′51″E
- Country: Estonia
- County: Hiiu County
- Parish: Hiiumaa Parish
- Time zone: UTC+2 (EET)
  - Summer (DST): UTC+3 (EEST)

Putkaste (German: Putkas) is a village in Hiiumaa Parish, Hiiu County in northwestern Estonia.

The population is around 80 citizens.
