= Utu, Estonia =

Village in Estonia

Utu
- Village
- Location within Estonia
- Coordinates: 58°48′N 22°43′E
- Country: Estonia
- County: Hiiu County
- Parish: Hiiumaa Parish
- Time zone: UTC+2 (EET)
  - Summer (DST): UTC+3 (EEST)

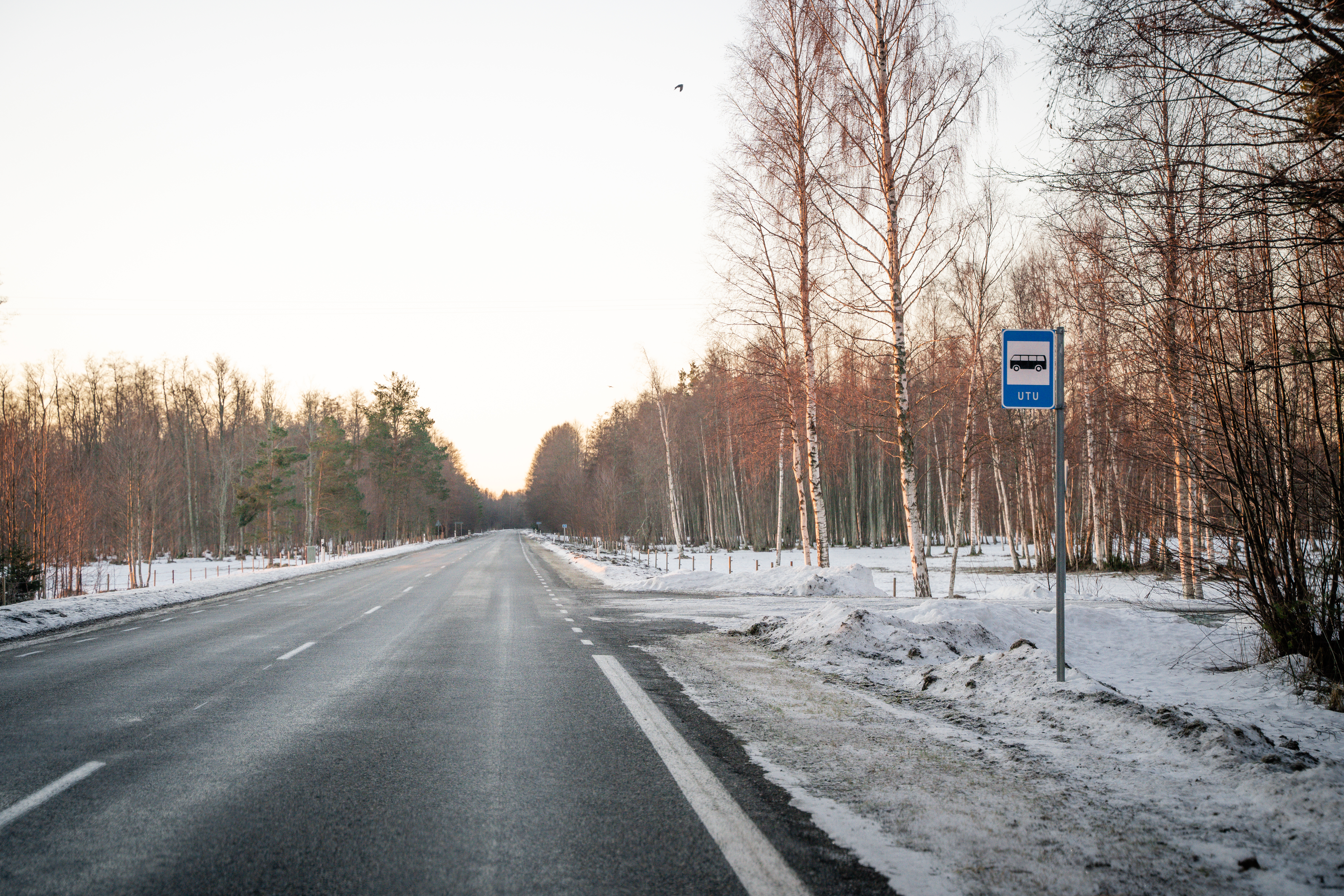
Utu village

Utu is a village in Hiiumaa Parish, Hiiu County, on the island of Hiiumaa, Estonia.
