= Heinz Valk =

Estonian artist, caricaturist and politician

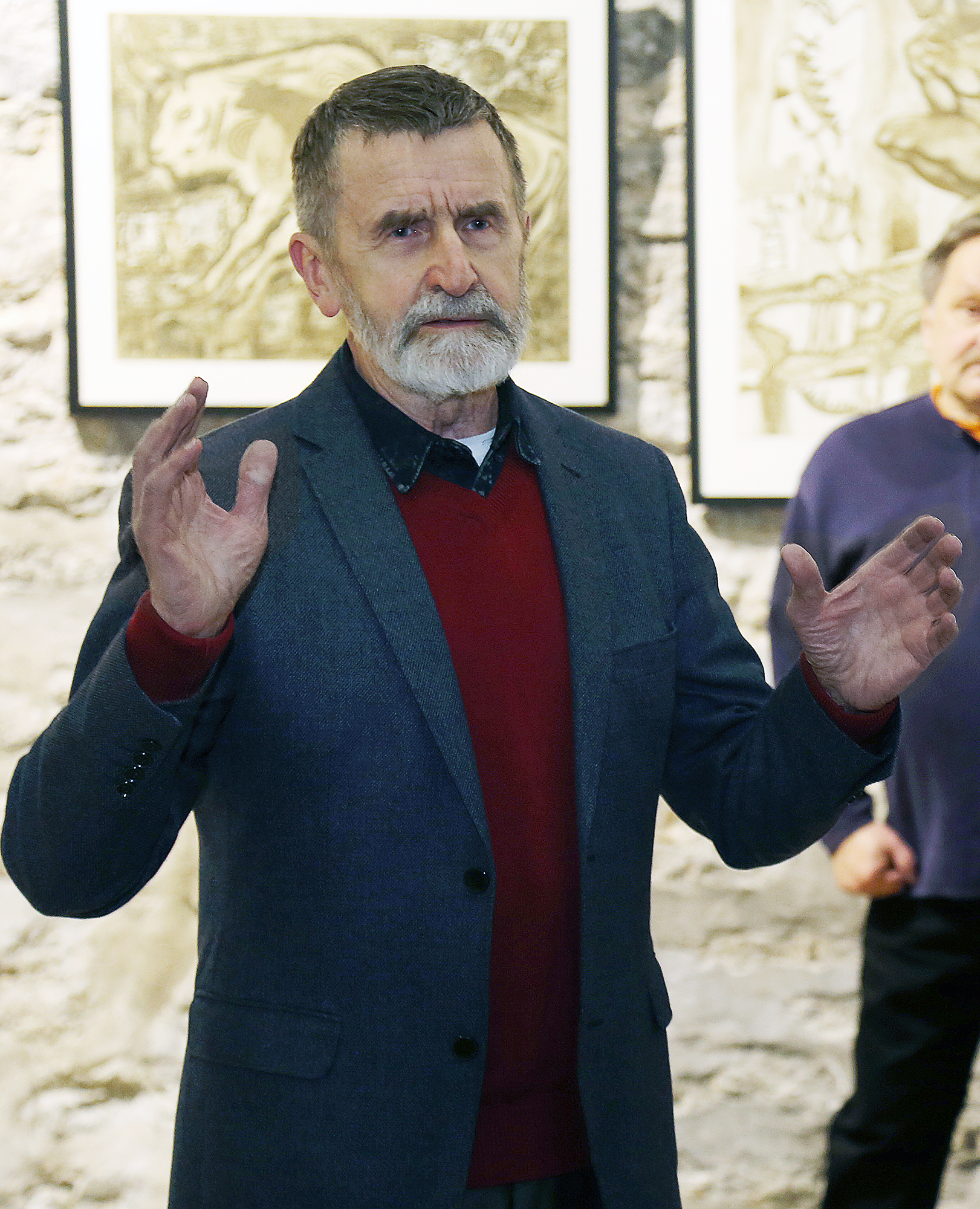
Heinz Valk in 2017.

Heinz Valk (birth name Heinrich Valk; born March 7, 1936, in Gatchina) is an Estonian artist, caricaturist and politician. He is credited for coining the term "Singing Revolution" (Estonian: laulev revolutsioon) and its slogan "One day, no matter what, we will win!" (Estonian: Ükskord me võidame niikuinii!) some of the most famous and prophetic sentences describing the Estonians' non-violent freedom fight in 1988–1991 against the then Soviet occupation regime, which eventually was indeed successful as Estonians "won" when the country restored its full independence in August 1991.

Valk was married to the ceramist Mall Valk (née Sooster, 1935–1976).
