= Esiküla =

Village in Estonia

- Village
- Location within Estonia
- Coordinates: 58°48′N 22°50′E
- Country: Estonia
- County: Hiiu County
- Parish: Hiiumaa Parish
- Time zone: UTC+2 (EET)
  - Summer (DST): UTC+3 (EEST)

Esiküla is a village in Hiiumaa Parish, Hiiu County in northwestern Estonia. The village is located on Kassari Island.

== Name ==
Esiküla was attested in historical sources as Kassarske Förbyn ell. Eszekülla in 1688 and as Essi in 1798. The name literally means 'front village', semantically contrasting with nearby Taguküla (literally, 'back village'), referring to their relative positions.

== History ==
Historically, the village was part of Kassari Manor (German: Kassar). In 1977, the villages of Kiisi and Uidu were merged with Esiküla.

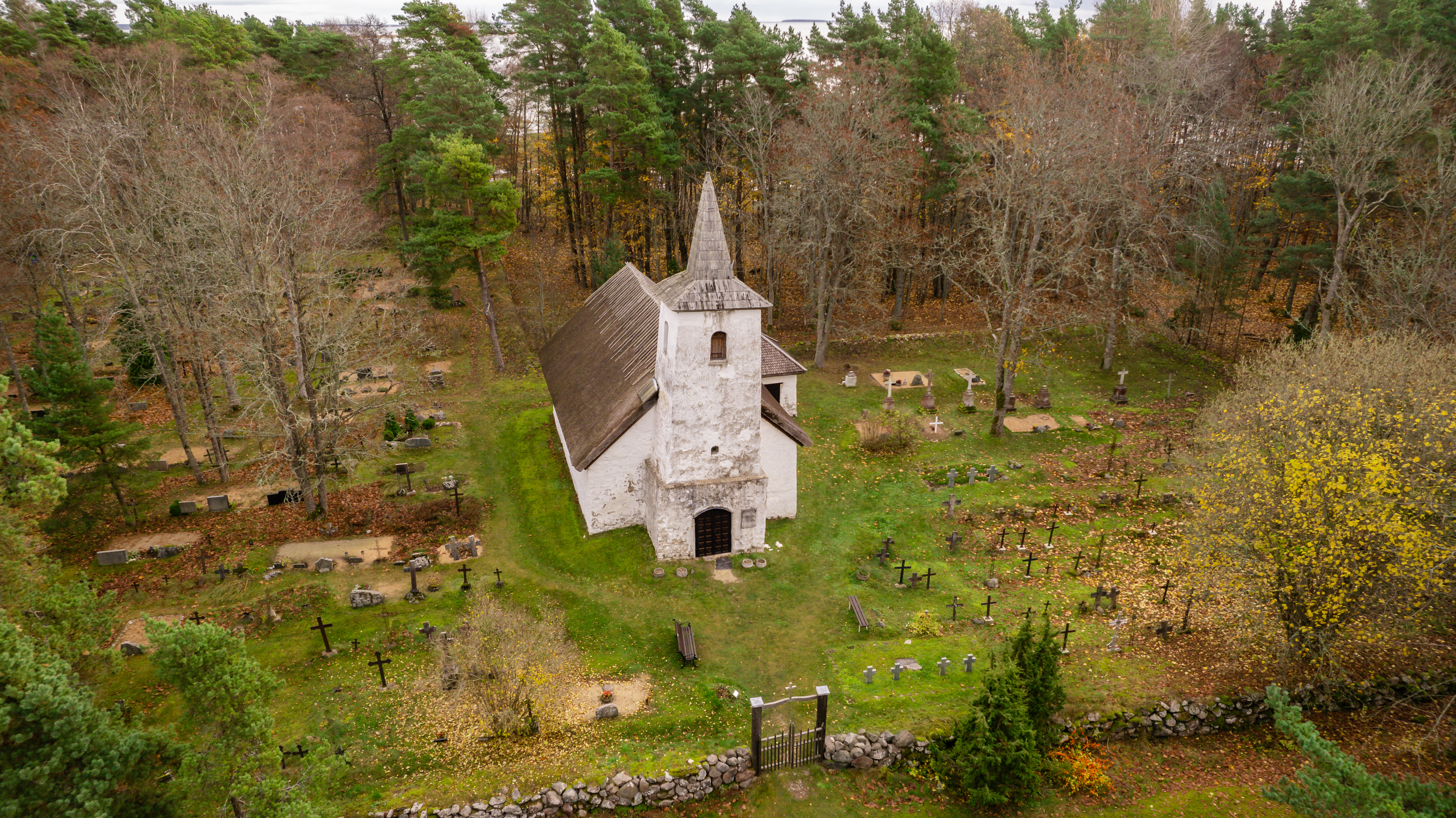

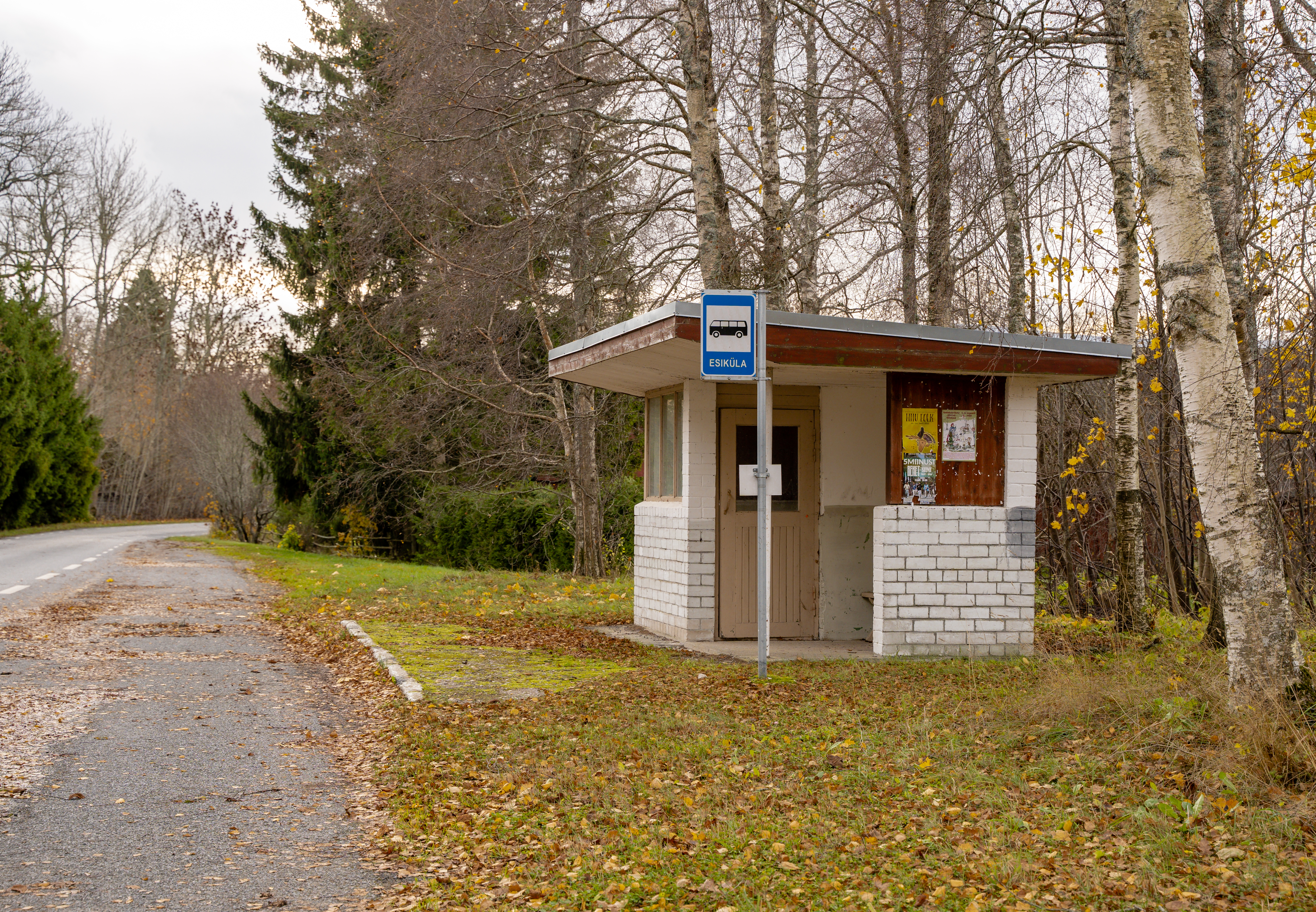

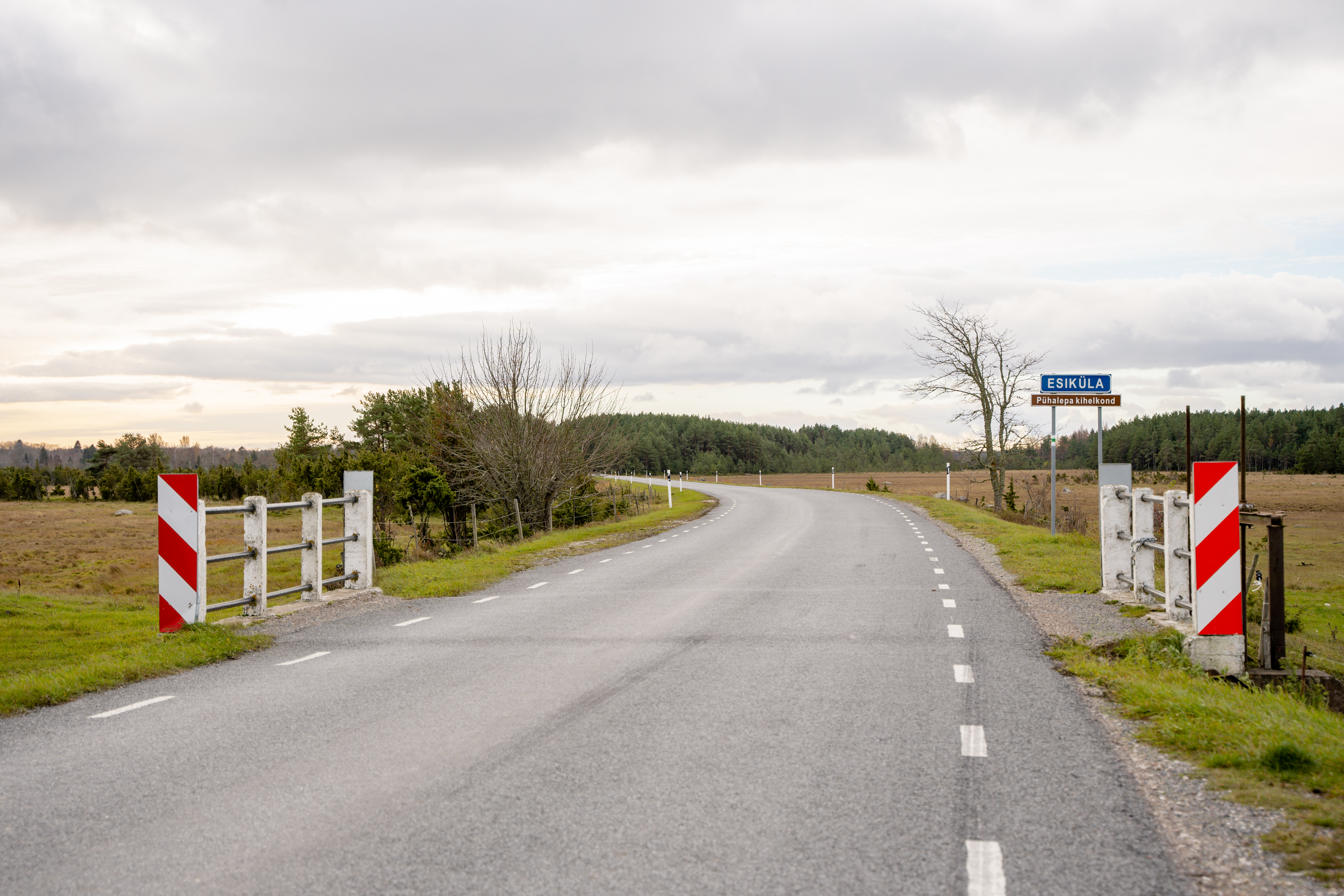

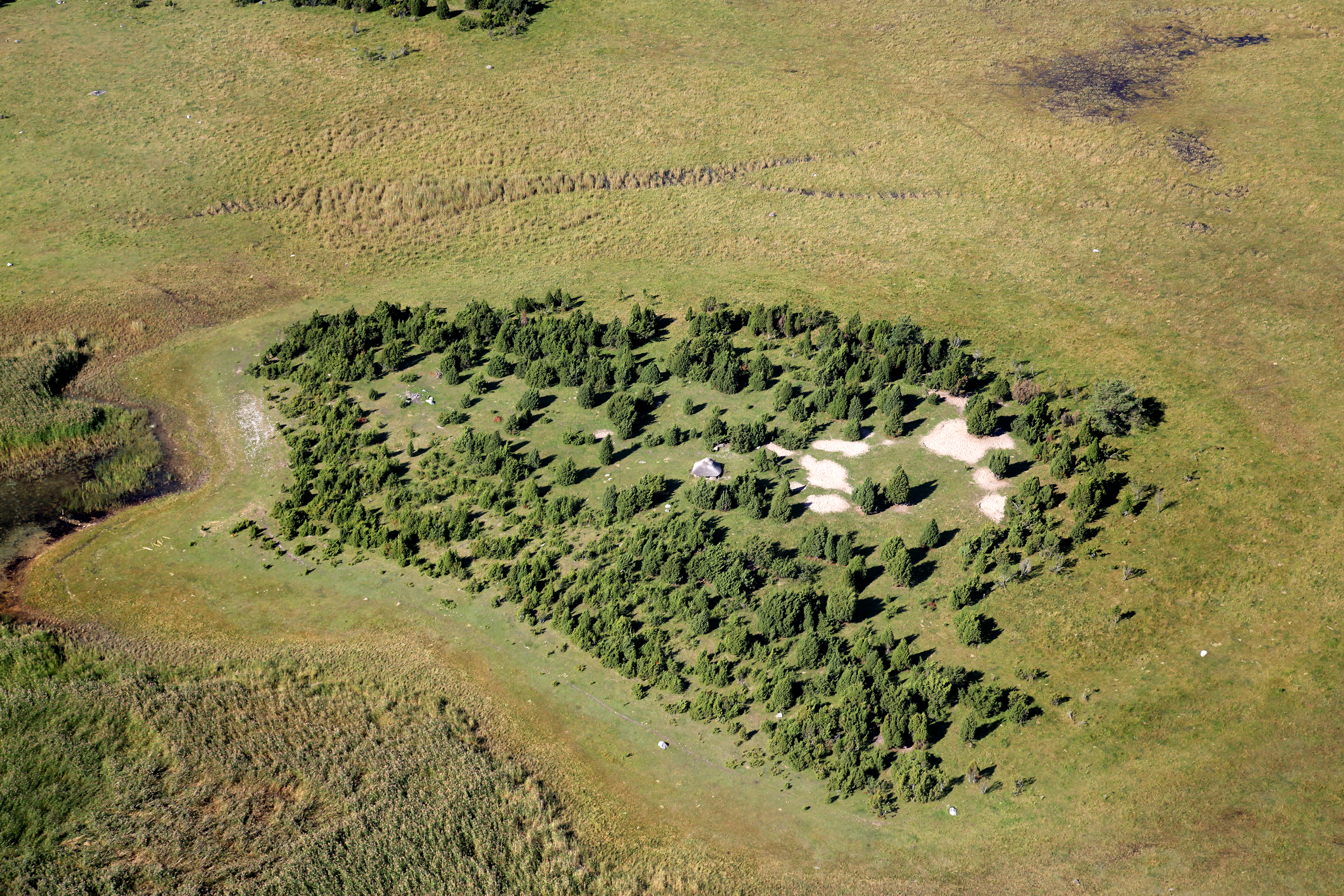

== See also ==
- Taguküla
