= Taguküla =

Village in Estonia

- Village
- Location within Estonia
- Coordinates: 58°48′N 22°52′E
- Country: Estonia
- County: Hiiu County
- Parish: Hiiumaa Parish
- Time zone: UTC+2 (EET)
  - Summer (DST): UTC+3 (EEST)

Taguküla is a village in Hiiumaa Parish, Hiiu County in northwestern Estonia.

== Name ==
Taguküla was attested in historical sources as Kassarske Baakbyyn ell. Taggokülla in 1688, Takakyla in 1709, and Taggo in 1798. The name literally means 'back village', semantically contrasting with nearby Esiküla (literally, 'front village'), referring to their relative positions.

== Gallery ==
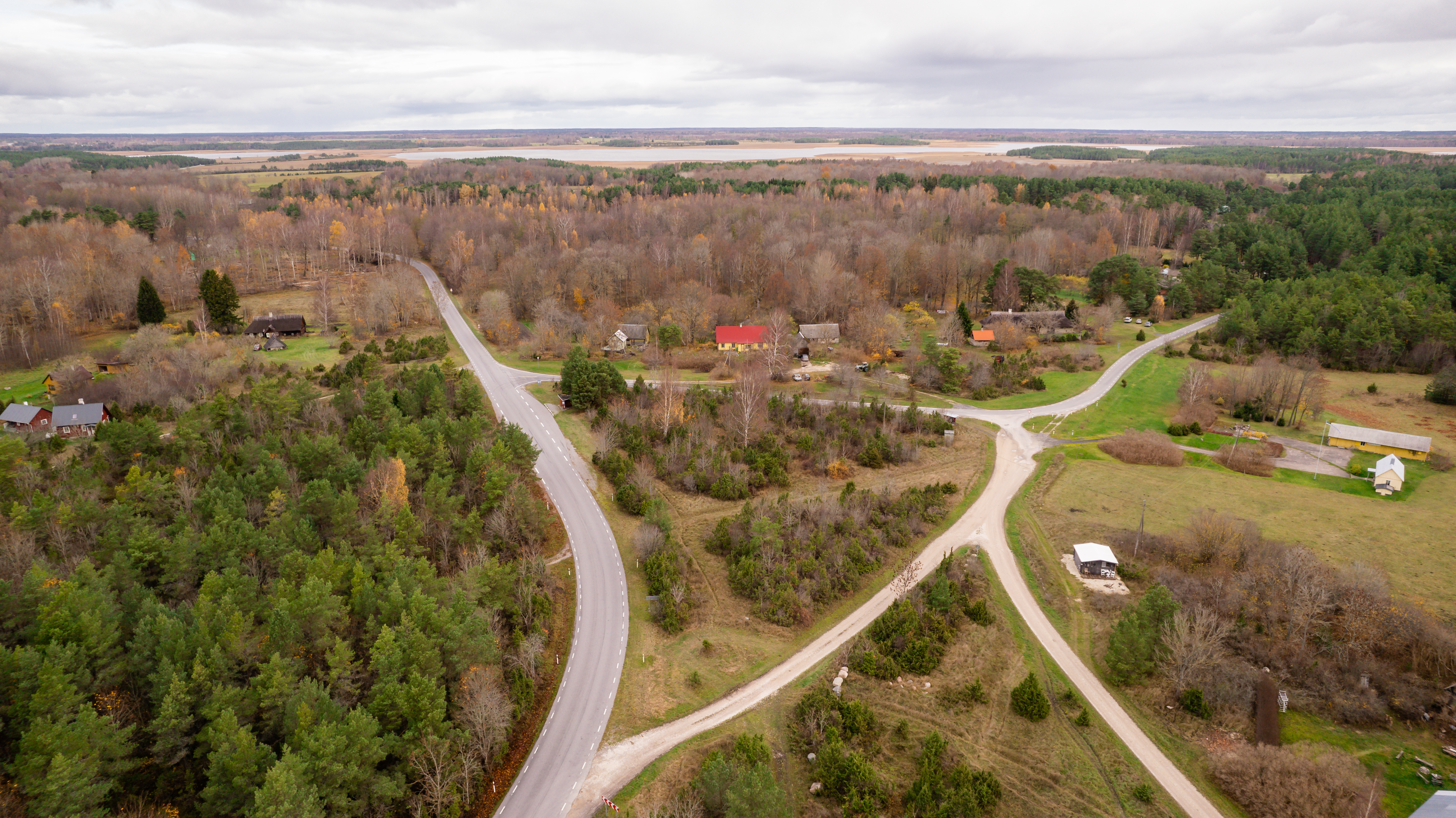

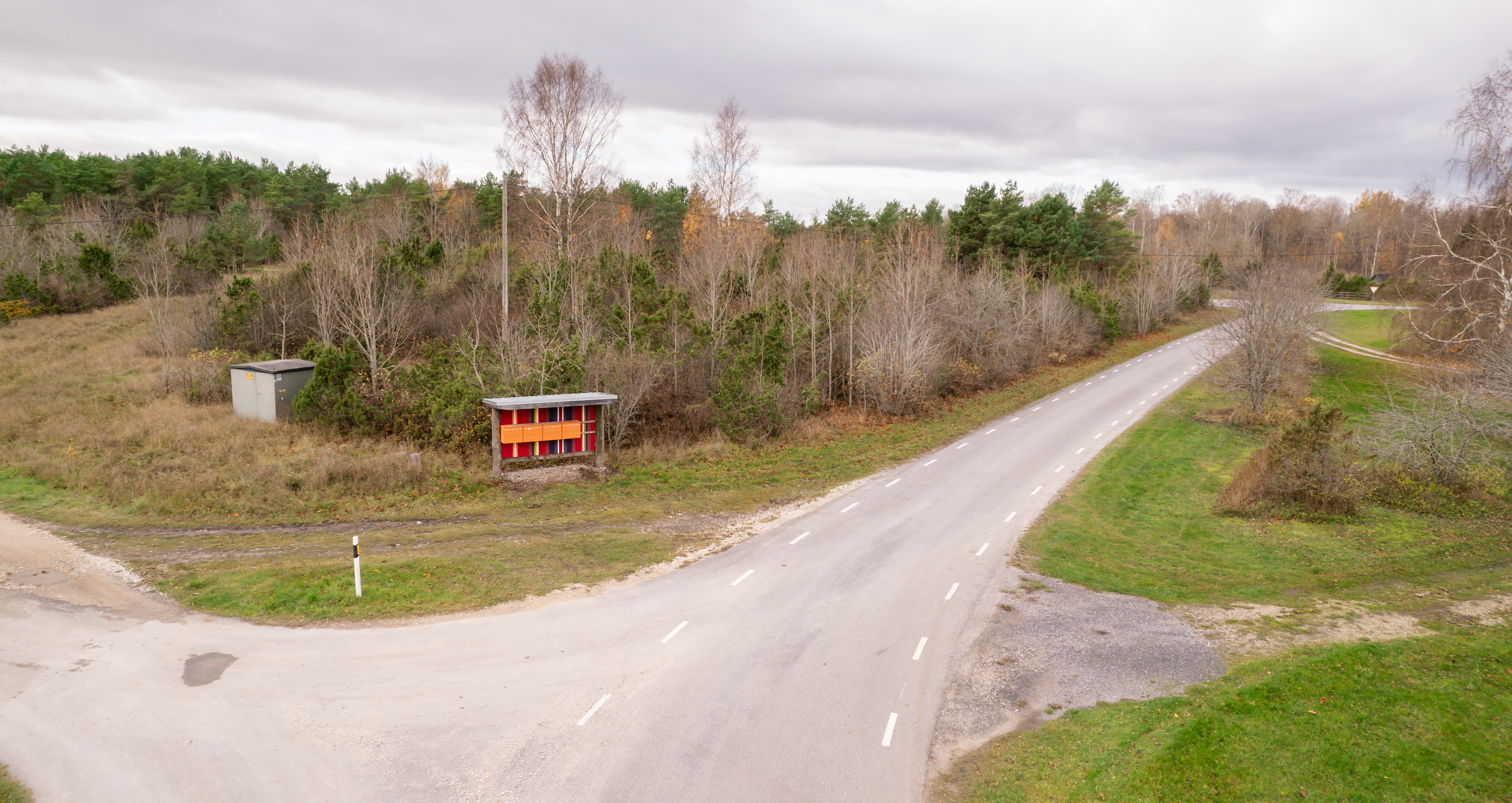

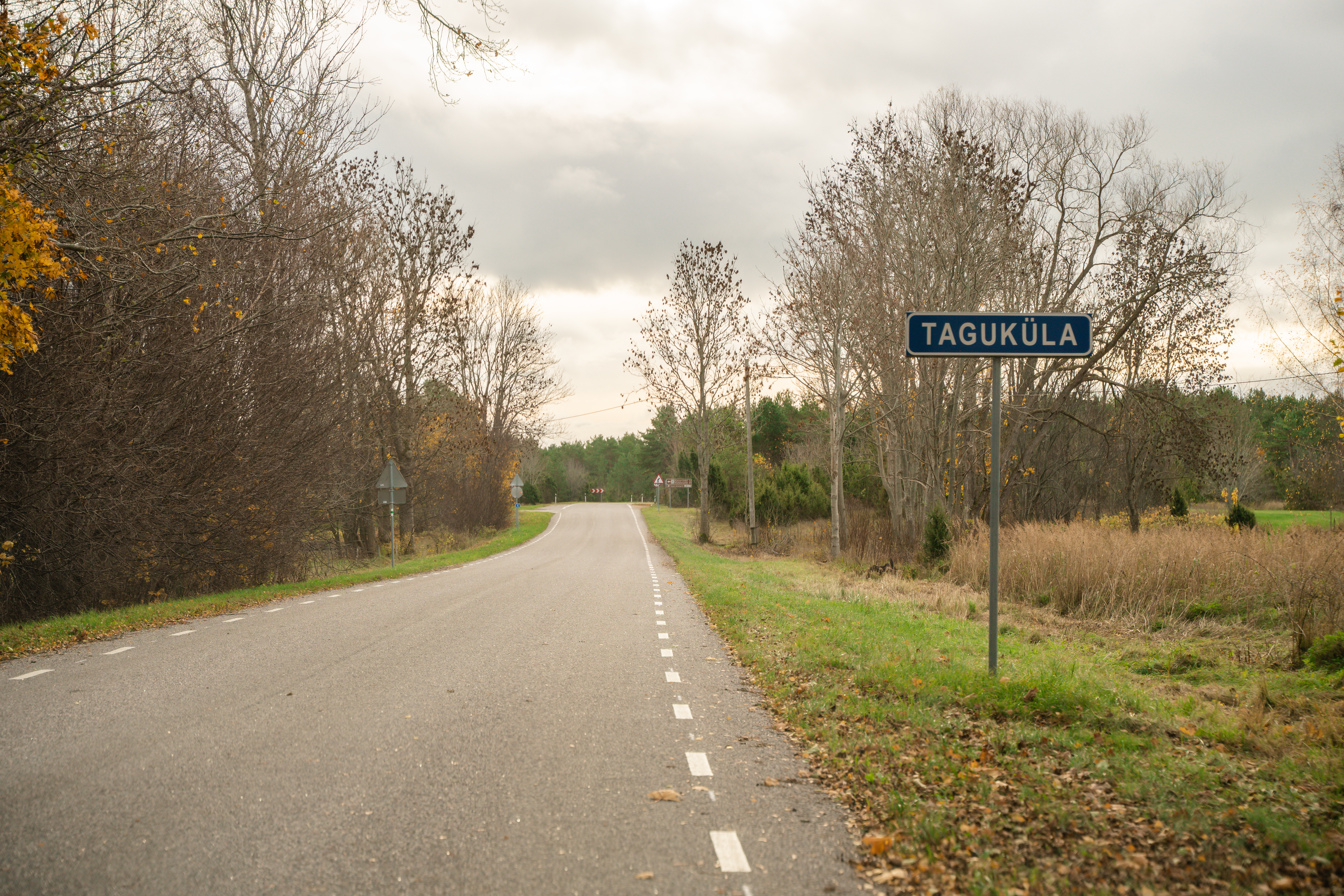

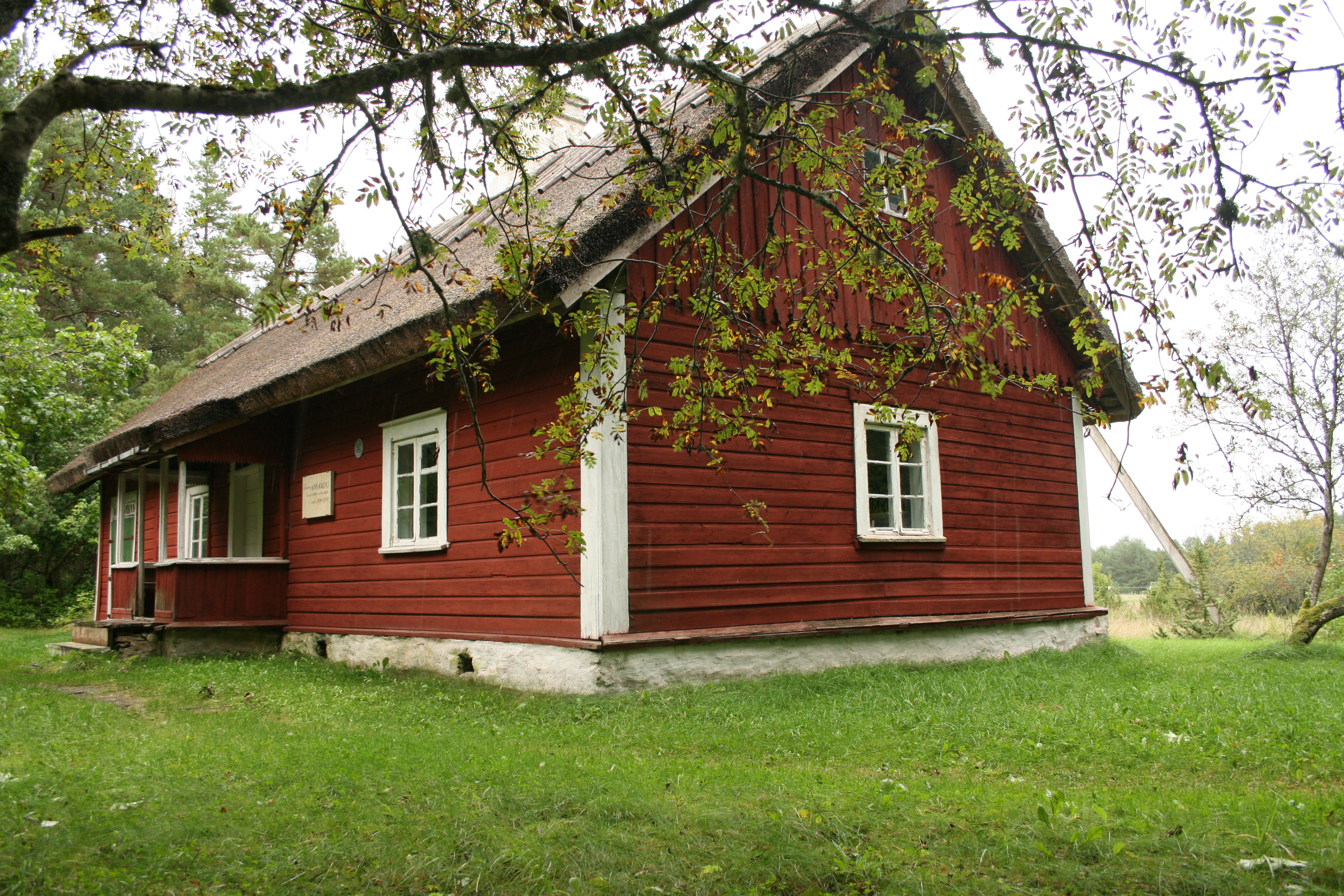
