= Pieter de Valck =

Dutch Golden Age painter

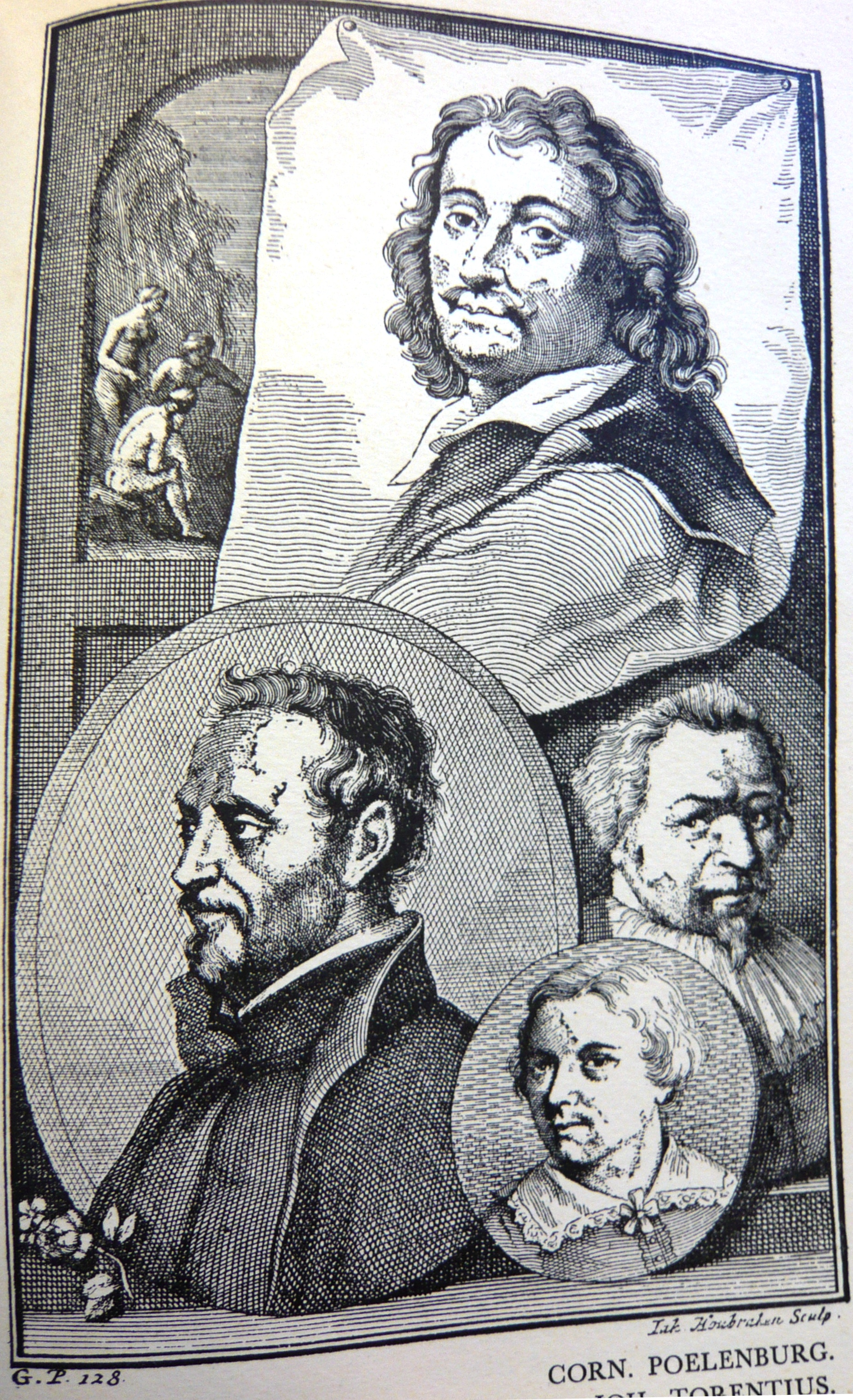
Portrait of Pieter de Valk lower right in Houbraken's Schouburg.

Pieter Jacobsz. de Valck (1584–1625) was a Dutch Golden Age painter.

== Biography ==
De Valck was born and died in Leeuwarden. According to Houbraken, he was the son of a silversmith who learned to paint from Abraham Bloemaert (according to Joh. Hilarides van Bolswerd). He travelled to Italy and on his return became a respected court painter in Leeuwarden and had two sons who he taught to paint and who also travelled to Italy. They were taken captive in Genoa and sold as slaves on the Barbary coast, never to return. He himself continued to paint for the Leeuwarden court and was known for portraits, landscapes, and historical allegories. His selfportrait was in the hands of his daughter's daughter's daughter Antje Ieppes of Sneek. She made a copy and Houbraken engraved it.

According to the RKD he was a portrait painter who worked in Italy.
