= Selja, Hiiumaa Parish =

Village in Estonia

Selja
- Village
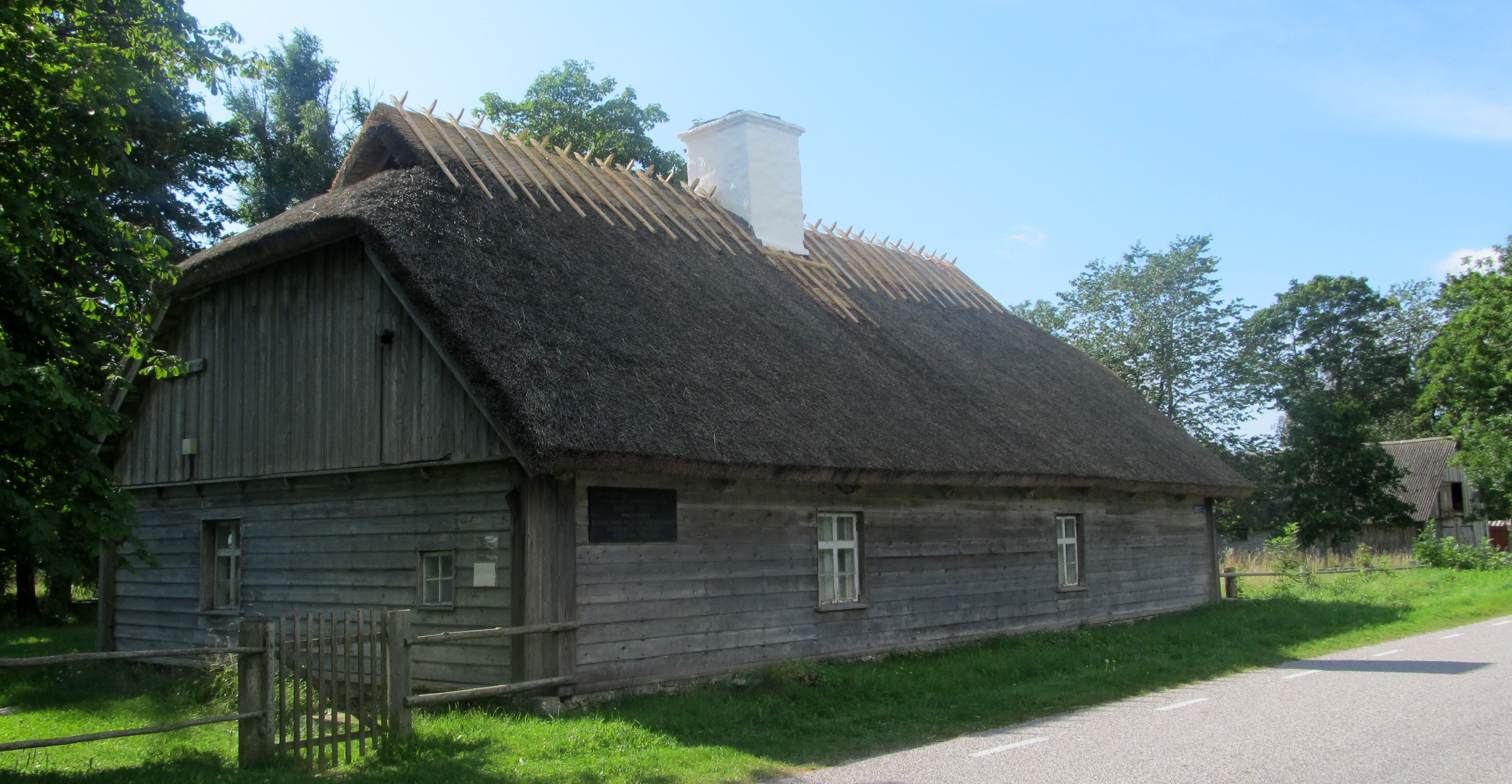
- The Rudolf Tobias Museum at his birthplace

- Location within Estonia
- Coordinates: 58°49′40″N 22°44′19″E
- Country: Estonia
- County: Hiiu County
- Parish: Hiiumaa Parish
- Time zone: UTC+2 (EET)
  - Summer (DST): UTC+3 (EEST)

Selja is a village in Hiiumaa Parish, Hiiu County in northwestern Estonia.

== Name ==
Selja was attested in historical sources as Selja Tönniß in 1665 (i.e., 'Tõnis [Anthony] from Selja', referring to a resident of the village) and Sellia by (i.e., 'Selja village') in 1709. The toponym is relatively frequent in Estonia and is derived from the common noun selg (genitive: selja) 'back, crest, ridge (of a hill)'.

== Notable people ==
Notable people that were born or lived in Selja include the following:

- Rudolf Tobias (1873–1918), first Estonian professional composer, born and spent his early childhood in Selja. In 1973, Tobias's birthplace was converted into a museum.
- Johannes Tobias (1847–1909), parish clerk and father of Rudolf Tobias
