= Mall Valk =

Estonian ceramist (1935–1976)

- Born: Mall Sooster; June 2, 1935; Ühtri, Hiiumaa Parish, Hiiu County, Estonia
- Died: October 12, 1976 (aged 41); Tallinn, Estonia
- Education: State Art Institute of the Estonian SSR
- Occupation: Ceramist
- Spouse: Heinz Valk

Mall Valk (née Mall Sooster; June 2, 1935 – October 12, 1976) was an Estonian ceramist.

== Early life and education ==
Mall Valk was born in Ühtri, Estonia as the daughter of the teachers Julius Sooster (1902–1942) and Elvi Sooster (1909–1978). When she was six years old, her father was executed by the NKVD in Irkutsk. In 1961, she graduated from the State Art Institute of the Estonian SSR (now the Estonian Academy of Arts).

== Career ==
In the 1960s and 1970s, Valk created humorous and sometimes grotesque plastic works based on situations and puns in ceramic. She was one of the ceramists that executed a panel in the Central Library of the Estonian Academy of Sciences in 1964 based on a design by Lepo Mikko. She died of lung cancer in Tallinn in 1976.

== Family ==
Mall Valk was the cousin of the painter Ülo Sooster (1924–1970). She was married to the caricaturist and politician Heinz Valk.

== Works ==
- 1962: Jane Eyre
- 1967: Isa silmaterad (Father's Eyes)
- 1967: Malekuningas (Chess King)
- 1970: Pärlikukk (Guinea Cock)
- 1970: Pärlikana (Guinea Hen)
