= Emmaste Parish =

Former municipality of Estonia

Coordinates: 58°42′12″N 22°37′00″E

Emmaste Parish Emmaste vald
- Municipality of Estonia
- Flag Coat of arms

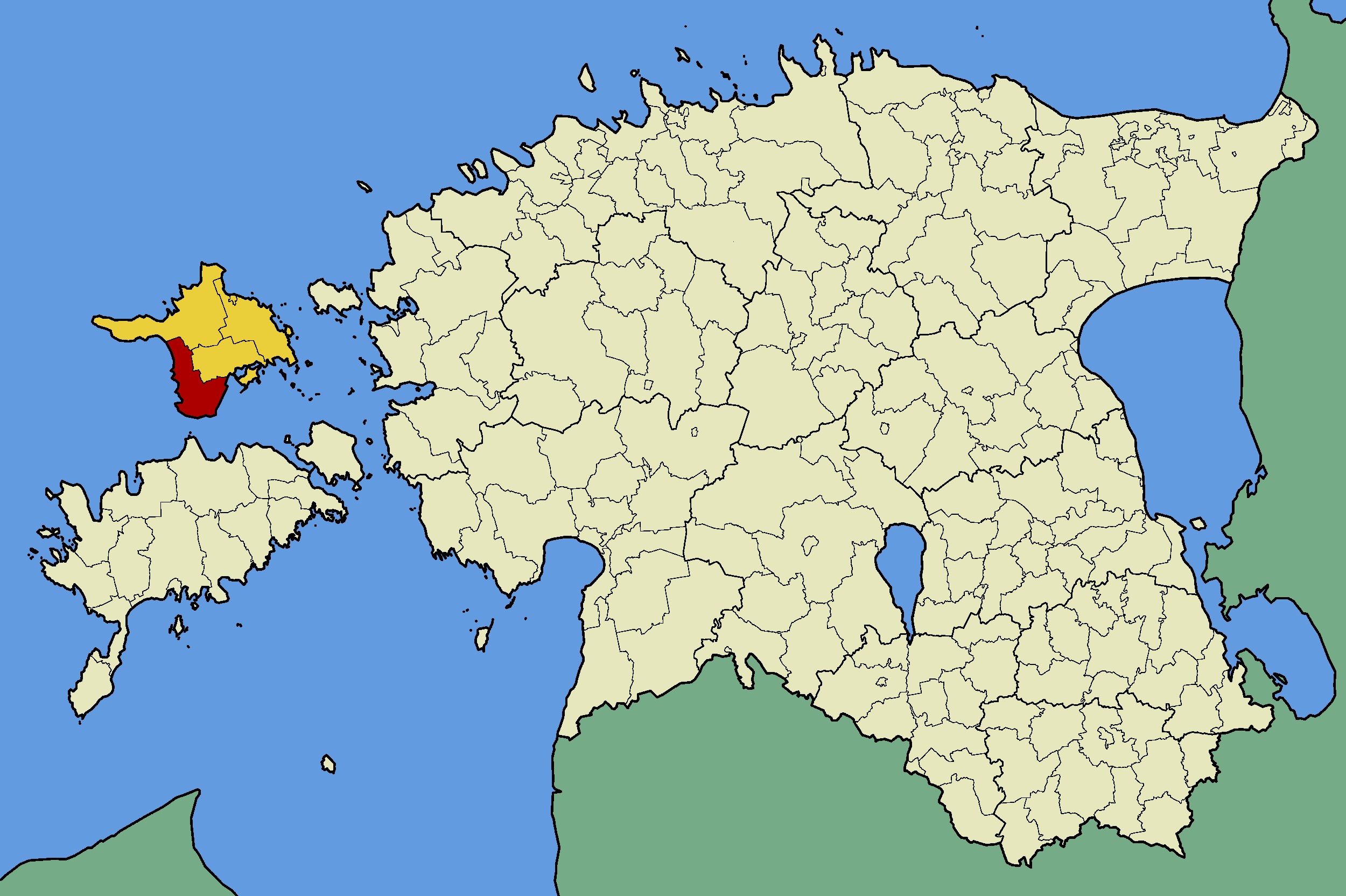
- Emmaste Parish within Hiiu County.
- Country: Estonia
- County: Hiiu County
- Administrative centre: Emmaste

Area
  - Total: 197 km^{2} (76 sq mi)

Population (01.01.2006)
  - Total: 1,266
  - Density: 6.43/km^{2} (16.6/sq mi)
- Website: www.emmaste.ee

Emmaste was a rural municipality of the Estonian county of Hiiumaa, located at the south of the island.

== Villages ==
Emmaste, Haldi, Haldreka, Harju, Härma, Hindu, Jausa, Kabuna, Kaderna, Kitsa, Kõmmusselja, Külaküla, Külama, Kurisu, Kuusiku, Laartsa, Lassi, Leisu, Lepiku, Metsalauka, Metsapere, Muda, Mänspe, Nurste, Ole, Prassi, Prähnu, Pärna, Rannaküla, Reheselja, Riidaküla, Selja, Sepaste, Sinima, Sõru, Tilga, Tohvri, Tärkma, Ulja, Valgu, Vanamõisa, Viiri, Õngu.
