= Lasis =

Lasis or LASIS may refer to:

- Lasi people, an ethnic group of Pakistan
- LASIS, or Laser ablation synthesis in solution, a method in nanotechnology
- Normunds Lasis (born 1985), Latvian cyclist

== See also ==
- Lasi (disambiguation)
- Lassi (disambiguation)
