= Sepaste Landscape Conservation Area =

Protected area in Estonia

- Location within Estonia
- Location: Estonia
- Coordinates: 58°43′N 22°31′E
- Area: 37 ha (91 acres)
- Established: 1998

Sepaste Landscape Conservation Area is a nature park which is located in Hiiu County, Estonia.

The area of the nature park is 37 ha.

The protected area was founded in 1998 to protect the oak forest and biodiversity in Sepaste village (Emmaste Parish).
