= Tilga Landscape Conservation Area =

Protected area in Estonia

- Location within Estonia
- Location: Estonia
- Coordinates: 58°43′N 22°37′E
- Area: 40 ha (99 acres)
- Established: 1998

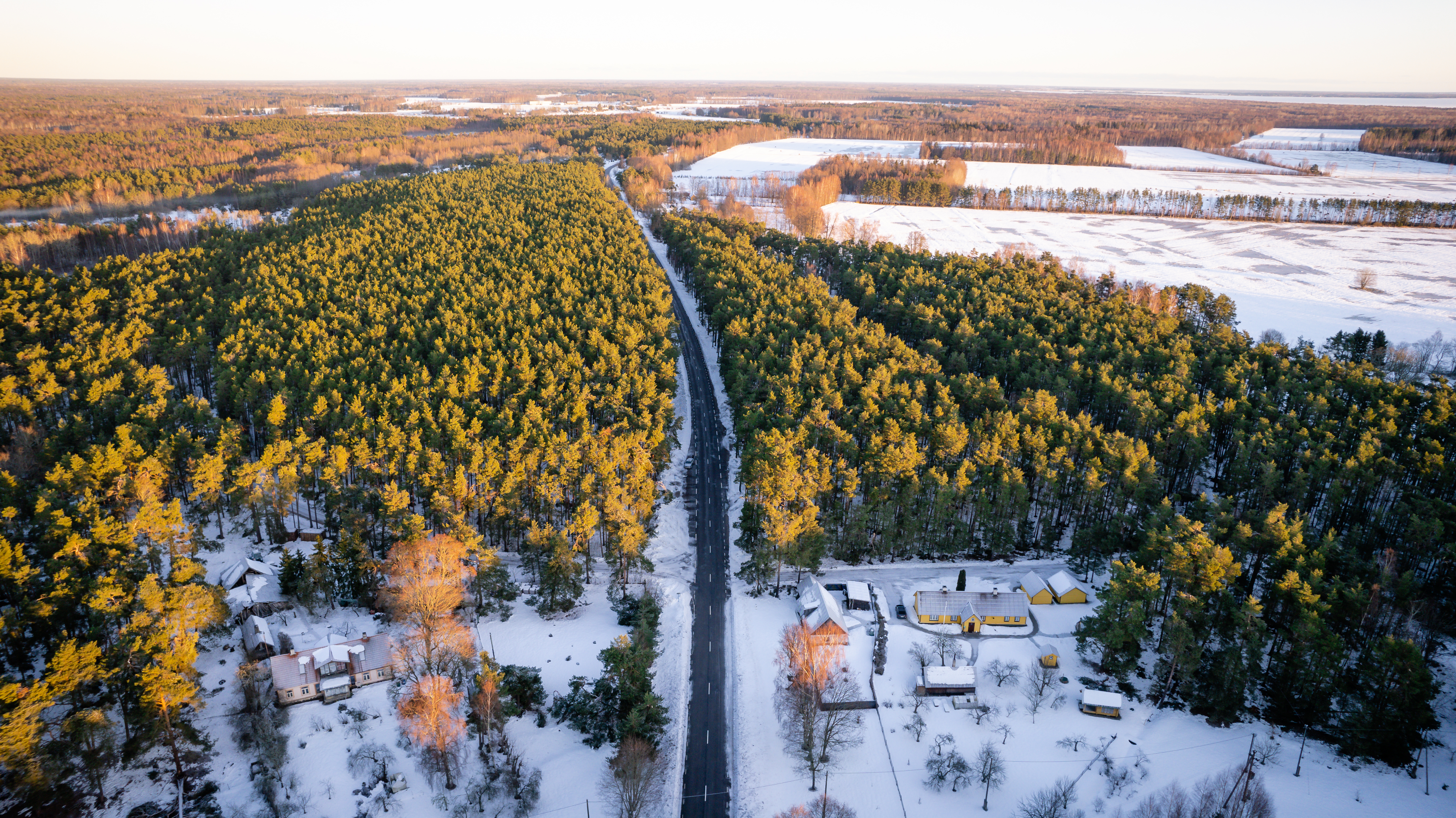

Tilga Landscape Conservation Area is a nature park which is located in Hiiu County, Estonia.

The area of the nature park is about 40 ha (99 acres).

The protected area was founded in 1998 to protect the pine forest on coastal ridge and its biodiversity. The area is located near Emmaste.
