= Tilga =

Tilga may refer to several places in Estonia:

- Tilga, Hiiu County, village in Emmaste Parish, Hiiu County
- Tilga, Tartu County, village in Rõngu Parish, Tartu County
