= Jassy =

Jassy may refer to:

- Iași, a city in north-eastern Romania, former capital of the Principality of Moldavia

== History ==
- Treaty of Jassy, a pact between Russian Empire and Ottoman Empire ending the Russo-Turkish War (1787–1792)
- First Jassy–Kishinev Offensive and Second Jassy–Kishinev Offensive, two 1944 World War II major offensives

== People ==
- Jassy (surname), several people
- Jasz people, an ethnic group in Hungary, of Ossetic origin

== Culture ==
- Adath Jeshurun of Jassy Synagogue, a defunct synagogue
- Jassy, a novel by Norah Lofts
- Jassy (film), a 1947 British film melodrama adaptation of the novel

== See also ==
- Iasi (disambiguation)
- Yassy (disambiguation)
