= Golodass =

Village in Gilgit-Baltistan

Coordinates: 36.2203°N 73.7488°E

Golodass (Urdu: گولوداس, "Gol" means 'riverine' and "Das" means 'barren land' in Khowar) is a village situated in Ghizer District, Punial Tehsil, Gilgit-Baltistan. This village is at two hours distance from Gilgit towards northwest on Ishkoman Road. The languages spoken in Golodass include Burushaski, Shina, Khowar, and Urdu. Nearby villages are Hatoon, Hasis, Gahkuch bala, Damas, and Silpi.

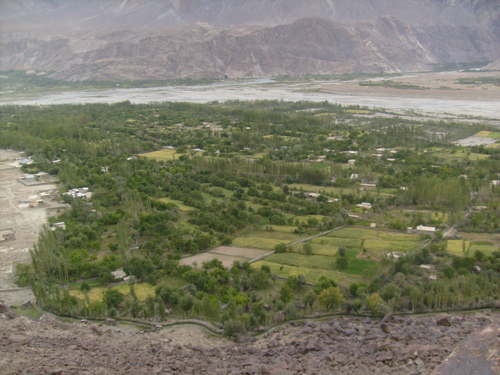
Golodass Village

== History ==
Golodass was previously known as “Golo koi”. In 1928 and onwards the Raja of Punial, Raja Anwar Khan decided to populate the upper barren portion of the village. The most difficult task was to bring water to the village though rocky mountains and sliding areas of Hindukush. Raja Anwer Khan contacted Hub-e-Ali of Hunza who was an expert in making water channels. Hub-e-Ali accepted this offer from Raja Anwar Khan and successfully built the canal in 1935. Raja Mir Aman Khan was the first school teacher in the village, who came here from Bubur village, Punial in 1965, and served up to 1997. The schools in village include Govt. School Golodass, Aga Khan Diamond Jubilee School, Safe Public School, Syed Alam Shaheed Public School and Eagle Mountain School. The Gujars of the village were brought by rajas for cattle production and farming.

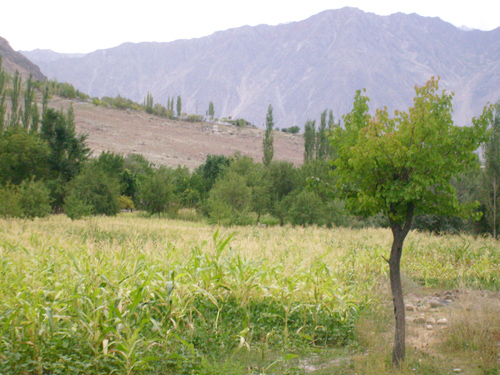
Golodass in Summer

== Traditions ==
The festivals of the village include Nowruz, which marks the first day of spring and the beginning of the year in Iranian calendar. It is celebrated on the day of the astronomical vernal equinox, which usually occurs on March 21 or the previous/following day depending on where it is observed. Geenani, which is celebrates when the wheat is ripened and fully ready to harvest. In the early morning, people wake up and after having breakfast they get ready to celebrate the ginani. The aged men or women of the village gather at a wheat fields. From the fields they get grains of wheat and put them into a bow having full of “diltar”. After that one by one they take a sip of lasi in a wooden spoon. Women makes different dishes at homes especially rice, meat or chicken. A local dish is prepared on this day is “giyaling”, wisken is eaten by dipping it in melted butter. DumanKhiya, the second most important crop of Punial is maize. It is cultivated in the mid of May and harvested in October. As the weather becomes cold after the month of October and crop is also ready to harvest in this month. When all the fields become empty at the end of October, people let their animals to fees on the open fields. No one is restricted to move on any field. All the animals are freely feed on the fields. After one week this cultural day is celebrated. Women make different local dishes on this day especially “GhoomFullai”.

Festival foods include Diram, Sharbat, Mull, Giyaling (with Dasi gee), Geenani, Shairashapic, Desi Ghee, Desi Oil, DiramFiti, Harisa, Diltar, Chamuriki, Chakah, Burus shapick, Dishao, Hala Sheer, and Chayee.

The valley Of Golodass produces fresh and dry fruits, including Apple, Pomegranate, Cherry, Pear, Grapes, Apricot, Almond, Peach, Raspberry, Almond, Walnuts, Apricot kernels, Dried apricot, and Kilao.
