= Kurisu =

Kurisu (栗須, 栗栖) is a Japanese surname. Notable people with the surname include:

- Hoichi Kurisu (born 1939), landscape architect
- Takeo Kurisu, 1947–1948 Japanese Minister of Finance
- Yumiko Kurisu (born 1961), classical soloist

== See also ==
- Nishi-Kurisu Station 西栗栖駅 (にしくりす)
- Kurisu, Emmaste Parish, a rural village in northwestern Estonia
- Steins;Gate, a video game with a character of the same name
