= Yassky =

Yassky is a surname. Notable people with the surname include:

- Chaim Yassky (1896–1948), physician and medical administrator in Jerusalem
- David Yassky (born 1964), American university administrator and politician

== See also ==
- Yassy (disambiguation)
