= Names of European cities in different languages (I–L) =

Different names for European cities in neighbouring languages

The names used for some major European cities differ in different European and sometimes non-European languages. In some countries where there are two or more languages spoken, such as Belgium or Switzerland, dual forms may be used within the city itself, for example on signage. This is also the case in Ireland, despite a low level of actual usage of the Irish language. In other cases where a regional language is officially recognised, that form of the name may be used in the region, but not nationally. Examples include the Welsh language in Wales in the United Kingdom, and parts of Italy and Spain.

There is a slow trend to return to the local name, which has been going on for a long time. In English Livorno is now used, the old English form of Leghorn having become antiquated at least a century ago. In some cases, such as the replacement of Danzig with Gdańsk, the official name has been changed more recently. Since 1995, the government of Ukraine has encouraged the use of Kyiv rather than Kiev.

== I ==
English name	Other names or former names
(Romania) Iași	Iași (Romanian*),^{[KNAB]} Iasi - 이아시 (Korean*), Iásio - Ιάσιο (Greek*), Iassium (Latin*), Iassy (French variant*, Historical variant*), Iassi (Historical variant*), Jaš - Јаш (Serbian*),^{[KNAB]} Yash - Яш (Bulgarian),^{[KNAB]} Jasai (Lithuanian*),^{[KNAB]} Jasi' (Latvian*), Jaši - Јаши (Serbian alternative*), Jassenmarkt (archaic German), Jassi (archaic Italian), Jassy (English variant*, German*,^{[KNAB]} Polish*,^{[KNAB]}), Jassy - Яссы (Russian*),^{[KNAB]} Jassy - Ясси (Ukrainian),^{[KNAB]} Jasy (Czech*^{[KNAB]}, Slovak*^{[KNAB]}), Jászvásár (Hungarian*), Yaş (Turkish*), Yas - יאס (Yiddish*), Yashi (Romani*), Yashi - (Japanese*), Yassi (Historical variant*), Yassy (Historical variant*), Yǎxī - 雅西 (Mandarin Chinese*), Yosh - יאש (Yiddish alternative)
(Italy) Iglesias	Esglésies* or Iglésies* (Catalan), Igeullesiaseu / Igŭllesiasŭ - 이글레시아스 (Korean), Iglesias (Italian*, Romanian*, Spanish*), Igresias (Sardinian)*, Is Cresias (former Sardinian)*, Villa di Chiesa (former Italian)*
(Finland) Iisalmi	Iisalmi (Finnish)*, Idensalmi (Swedish)*
(Netherlands) IJlst	Drylts (Western Frisian*), Ielst (Low Saxon*), IJlst (Dutch*)
(Netherlands) IJsselstein	Eiselsteinas (Lithuanian), Iesselstein (Low Saxon*, Zeelandic*), IJsselstein (Dutch*), Iselstein (Western Frisian*)
(Netherlands) IJzendijke	Eizendeikė (Lithuanian), Iezendieke (Zeelandic*), IJzendijke (Dutch*), Ysendyck (French*), Yzendyke (West Flemish*)
(Switzerland) Ilanz	Glion (Romansh)*, Ilanz (German)*
(Slovakia) Ilava	Ilava (Slovak*), Illau (German*), Illava (Hungarian*)
(Finland) Inari	Aanaar (Inari Sami), Anaar (Skolt Sami), Anár (Northern Sami)*, Enare (Swedish)*, Inari (Finnish)*, Inari – ინარი (Georgian*), Inari - 이나리 (Korean)
(Austria) Innsbruck	Dispruch (Ladin), Innsbruck (Finnish*, German*, Romanian*), Innzbruk (Hungarian), Inomost (Old Slovene)*, Innomostí* / Inšpruk* (Czech), Insbruka (Latvian)*, Insbrukas (Lithuanian)*, Insbruk'i – ინსბრუკი (Georgian*), Insbruque (Portuguese)*, Inseubeurukeu / Insŭbŭruk'ŭ - 인스브루크 (Korean), Insuburukku - インスブルック (Japanese)*, Inzbrik (Yiddish), Inzbruk (Serbian)*, Puntina (Romansh), 因斯布鲁克 (Chinese)
(Greece) Ioannina	Giannina (Italian)*, Ianina (Aromanian, Romanian*), Ioánnina - Ιωάννινα (Greek)*, Janina (Czech*, Finnish*, Lithuanian*, Portuguese*), Janinë* / Janina* (Albanian), Janjina - Јањина (Serbian)*, Joanina (Portuguese variant)*, Yánena - Γιάννενα* and Yánina - Γιάννινα* (Greek variants), Yanina (Azeri)*, Yanya (Turkish)*
(United Kingdom) (Scotland) Inverness	Inbhir Nis (Scots Gaelic)*, Inbhear Nis (Irish)*, Inbeoneseu / Inbŏnesŭ - 인버네스 (Korean), 因華尼斯 (Chinese-HK), 因弗內斯 (Chinese-PRC)*
(Greece) Iraklion	See Heraklion
(Turkey) Istanbul	Further information: Names of Istanbul Carigrad (Slovene), Estambol (Ladino)*, Estambul (Spanish)*, İstanbul (Azeri*, Turkish*), Iostanbúl (Irish), Iseutanbul or Isŭt'anbul – 이스탄불 (Korean), Isutambūru - イスタンブール (Japanese)*, Istamboul (French alternate)*, Istambul Portuguese*), Istambuł* or Stambuł* (Polish), Истамбул or Цариград (Bulgarian) استانبول = Estānbol (Persian*), Istanboel (Afrikaans, Dutch*), Isṭanbūl – إسطنبول (Arabic)*, Istanbul (Bosnian*, Croatian*, Czech*, German*, French*, Italian*, Ladino alternate *, Maltese, Romanian*, Serbian* Tagalog*), Isztambul (Hungarian)*, Konstantinúpolis – Κωνσταντινούπολις* or I Póli – Η Πόλη* (i.e. "The City") (Greek), Mikligarður (Icelandic)*, Stamboll (Albanian)*, Stamboul (French alternate [old, rare])*, Stambul – Ստամբուլ (Armenian)*, Stambul – Стамбу́л (Russian*, Ukrainian*), Stambula (Latvian)*, Stambulas (Lithuanian)*, St'ambuli – სტამბული (Georgian*), Stenbol (Kurdish)*, Sztambul (old Hungarian)*, Yīsītǎnbǎo 伊斯坦堡* or Yīsītǎnbù'ěr 伊斯坦布爾* (Chinese) Former names: Asitane, Dersaadet, Estambul, Konstantiniye, Konstantinopyla, Kospoli, Kostan, Kushta, Kushtandina or Payitaht (Payitaht, from Persian پایتخت simply means "Capital City", taht meaning "throne"; Turkish variants during Ottoman period), Beasantian or Baile Chòiseam (Scottish Gaelic), an Bhiosáint or Cathair Chonstaintín (Irish), Bysans* or Byzantion* or Konstantinopel* (Swedish), Bysants* or Konstantinopel* (Norwegian), Bizanc* or Carigrad* or Konstantinopel* (Slovene), Bizánc* or Konstantinápoly* (Hungarian), Bizanci* or Constantinoble* (Catalan), Bizancio* or Constantinopla* (Spanish), Bizâncio* or Constantinopla* (Portuguese), قسطنطنیه = Qostantaniyeh (Persian), Biżanzju or Kostantinopli (Maltese), Bizancjum* or Carogród* or Konstantynopol* (Polish), Bizans* or Qüstəntiniyyə* (Azeri), Bizant*, Carigrad* or Konstantinopol* (Croatian), Bizanţ*, Constantinopol*, Constantinopole*, Stambul* or Ţarigrad* (Romanian), Bisanzio* or Costantinopoli* (Italian),Byzance* or Constantinople* or Stamboul* (French), Byzantion* or Cařihrad* or Konstantinopol* (Czech), Byzantium* or Constantinopolis* (Latin), Byzantium * or Constantinople* (English), Byzanz* or Byzantion* or Konstantinopel* (German), Caergystennin (Welsh)*, Caregrad – Царегра́д, Carjgrad – Царьгра́д, Carjgorod – Царьгород, Vizantij – Виза́нтий or Konstantinopolj – Константино́поль (Russian)*, Carigrad* or Konstantinopolj* or Stambol* (Serbian), Carihrad* or Konštantínopol* (Slovak), Constantinopel (Dutch)*, Konseutantinopolliseu or K'onsŭt'ant'inop'ollisŭ – 콘스탄티노폴리스 (Korean), Konstantínópel (Icelandic)*, Konstantinopla (Tagalog*), K'onst'ant'inop'oli – კონსტანტინოპოლი (Georgian*), Konstantinopoli (Finnish*), Konsutantinōpuru – コンスタンティノープル (Japanese)*, Kostandnoubolis – Կոստանդնուպոլիս* (Armenian), Miklagård (old Swedish)*, Miklagarðr (Old Norse), Qushta – קושטא/איסטנבול (Hebrew)*, Vizántion – Βυζάντιον* or Konstantinoupoli – Κωνσταντινούπολη* (Greek), Bàizhàntíng – 拜占庭 or Jūnshìtǎndīngbǎo – 君士坦丁堡 (Chinese)*, Tsarigrad – Цариград (Bulgarian)*
(Finland) Ivalo	Avveel (Inari Sami)*, Âˊvvel (Skolt Sami)*, Avvil (Northern Sami)*, Ivalo (Finnish)*
(Russia) Ivangorod	Ivangorod – Ивангород (Russian)*, Jaanilinn (Estonian)*, Iivananlinna (Finnish)
(Ukraine) Ivano-Frankivsk	Ivano-Frankivsjk – Івано-Франківськ (Ukrainian)*, Ivano-Frankovsk – Ивано-Франковск (Russian)*, Iwano-Frankowsk (Polish)*, İvano-Frankovsk (Turkish)*, Ivano-Frankivskas (Lithuanian)*, Ivano-prank'ivsk'i – ივანო-ფრანკივსკი (Georgian*), Iwano-Frankiwsk (German)*, Stanislau (former German)*, Stanislavov - Станиславов (former Russian)*, Stanislavovas (former Lithuanian)*, Stanislev - סטאַניסלעװ (Yiddish)*, Stanisławów (former Polish)*, Stanyslaviv - Станиславів (former Ukrainian)*
(Belgium) Izegem	Iseghem (French*), Izegem (Dutch*), Izegemas (Lithuanian), Yzegem (West Flemish*)

== J ==
English name	Other names or former names
(Czech Republic) Jablonec nad Nisou	Gablonz an der Neiße (German)*, Jabłonec nad Nysą (Polish)*
(Czech Republic) Jablunkov	Jabłonków (Polish)*, Jablunkov (Czech)*, Jablunkau (German)*
(Finland) Jakobstad	Jakobstad (Swedish)*, Pietarsaari (Estonian*, Finnish*)
(Poland) Jarosław	Jaroslau (German)*, Jaroslav (Czech), Jarosław (Polish)*, Yareslev - יאַרעסלעװ (Yiddish)*, Jaroslav - Ярослав (Russian)*, 雅羅斯拉夫 (Chinese)
(Poland) Jastrzębie-Zdrój	Jastrzębie-Zdrój (Polish)*, Bad Königsdorff-Jastrzemb (German)*, Ястшембе-Здруй (Russian)*
(Slovakia) Jelšava	Alnovia (Latin), Eltsch (German*), Ilsau (archaic German), Jelschau (archaic German), Jelšava (Slovak*), Jelšava – Јелшава (Serbian*), Jolsva (Hungarian*)
(Latvia) Jelgava	Elgava – ელგავა (Georgian*), Jelgava (Latvian, Lithuanian)*, Mintauja (Old Lithuanian)*, Mitau (German)*, Mitava - Митава* / Jelgava - Елгава* (Russian), Mitawa (Polish)*
(Germany) Jena	Iéna (French)*, Iena (Portuguese*, Romanian*), Jena (German)*, Iena - Ιένα (Greek)*, Jéna (Hungarian)*, Jjena - Йена (Russian)* 耶拿 (Chinese)
(Czech Republic) Jihlava	Iglau (German)*, Igława (Polish)*, Jihlava (Czech)*
(Belgium) Jodoigne	Djodogne (Walloon*), Geldenaken (Dutch*), Geldenaeken (Zeelandic*), Geldoniacum (Latin*) Jodoigne (French*)
(Sweden) Jokkmokk	Dálvvadis (Lule Sami alternate), Jåhkåmåhkke (Lule Sami), Johkamohkki (Northern Sami)*, Jokimukka (Finnish)*, Jokinmukka, (Meänkieli), Jokkmokk (Swedish)*
(Germany) Jülich	Gulik (Dutch), Jülich (English, German), Juliers (French)
(Lithuania) Jurbarkas	Jurbarkas (Lithuanian)*, Georgenburg* / Jurgenburg* / Eurburg* (German), Jurborg / Jurburg' / Yurburg / Yurberig / Yurbrik (Yiddish)*, Jurbarkas (Samogitian)*

== K ==
English name	Other names or former names
(Finland) Kajaani	K'aiaani – კაიაანი (Georgian*), Kajaani (Finnish)*, Kajana (Swedish)*
(Russia) Kaliningrad	after 2023: Królewiec (Polish)* after 1946: Kaliningrado / Calininegrado (Portuguese variants)*, Kaliningrad - Калининград (Bulgarian*, Russian*), Kalininhrad - Калінінград (Belarusian*, Ukrainian*), Kalíngrad (Icelandic)*, Kaliningrad (Finnish*, Romanian*, Maltese, Swedish*, Turkish*), Kaliningrad - Καλίνινγκραντ (Greek)*, Kaliningrad* (Polish), Kaliningradas, Karaliaučius (Lithuanian)*, Kalėningrads, Karaliaučios (Samogitian)*, Kaļiņingrada (Latvian)*, Kaliningrado (Portuguese*, Spanish*), Kalinjingrad (Croatian) *, Kalinyingrád, Königsberg (Hungarian)*, Kaljinjingrad - Каљињинград (Serbian)*, Karīningurādo - カリーニングラード (Japanese)*, Jiālǐnìnggélè - 加里寧格勒 (Chinese). before 1946: Königsberg (German*, Hungarian*), Kunnegsgarbs, Twangste (Old Prussian), Karaliaučius (Lithuanian)*, Karaliaučios (Samogitian)*, Kēnigsberga, Karaļauči (Latvian)*, Keningsbergen (West Frisian*), Keunigsbarg (Low Saxon)*, Koningsbergen (Dutch)*, Královec (Czech)*, Królewiec (Polish)*, Karalaviec - Каралявец (Belarusian)*, Kionigsberg - Кёнигсберг, Korolevets - Короле́вец (Russian)*, Kenigsberg - קעניגסבערג (Yiddish)*, Kēnihisuberuku - ケーニヒスベルク (Japanese)*, Kēnísībǎo - 柯尼斯堡 (Chinese), Kenixvérghi - Καινιξβέργη (Greek)*, Conisberga, Konigsberga (Portuguese)*, Regiomontium (Latin)*
(Sweden) Kalix	Calix (former Swedish)*, Gáinnas (Northern Sami)*, Gájnaj (Lule Sami), Gálás (Northern Sami alternate), Kainus (Meänkieli), Kainuu (Finnish)*, Kalix (Swedish)*, Kôlis (local Swedish)*
(Germany) Kamenz	Kamenz (German)*, Kamjenc (Upper Sorbian)
(Ukraine) Kamianets-Podilskyi	Kamaniçe (Turkish), Camenecium (Latin)*, Cameniţa (Romanian)*, Kamenets - קאַמענעץ (Yiddish)*, Kamenec-Podoljskij - Каменец-Подольский (Russian)*, Kamieniec Podolski (Polish)*, Kamjanecj-Podiljsjkyj, otherwise transcribed as Kamyanets'-Podil's'kyi or Kamyanets-Podilskyi - Кам’янець-Подільський (Ukrainian)*, Kamjanets-Podilskyi (Finnish)*, Kamenyec-Podolszkij (Hungarian)*, Kamyanets-Podilskıy (Crimean Tatar)
(Ukraine) Kamianske	Kamenskoe (former German)*, Kamenskoe - Каменское (Russian), Kamenskoye (former English), Kamianske (English, French, Portuguese, Romanian), K'amiansk'e – კამიანსკე (Georgian*), Kamianskė (Lithuanian), Kamianské (Spanish), Kamianske - Кам'янскэ (Belarusian), Kamienskaje - Каменскае (Taraškievica Belarusian), Kamieńskie (Polish), Kamjanske (Czech, Dutch, Estonian, German, Latvian), Kamjanszke (Hungarian), Kamyanske (Crimean Tatar, Turkish), Kamian'ske - Камяньске (Rusyn), Kam'ians'ke - Кам'янське (Ukrainian) in 1936-2016: Dneprodzeržinsk - Днепродзержинск (Russian), Dniepradziaržynsk - Днепрадзяржынск (Belarusian, Taraškievica Belarusian), Dnieprodzierżyńsk (Polish), Dniprodserschynsk (German), Dniprodzerzhynsk (English), Dniprodzeržyns′k - Дніпродзержинськ (Ukrainian)*
(Netherlands) Kampen	Kampen (Dutch*), Kampena (Latvian*), Kampenas (Lithuanian), Kampn (West Flemish*)
(Russia) Kandalaksha	Kandalakša - Кандалакша (Russian)*, Kannanlahti* / Kantalahti* (Finnish), Käddluhtt (Skolt Sami)
(Poland) Kartuzy	Cartusia (Latin)*, Karthaus (German)*, Kartuzë (Kashubian)*, Kartuzy (Polish)*
(Finland) Kaskinen	Kaskinen (Finnish), Kaskö (Swedish)
(Poland) Katowice	Katowice (Polish*, Hungarian*), Katovicai (Lithuanian)*, Katovice (Bulgarian*), Katovice (Czech*, Latvian*, Romanian*, Serbian*, Slovakian*), Katoviçe (Turkish)*, K'at'ovitse – კატოვიცე (Georgian*), Kattowitz (German)*; Stalinogród (Polish 1953–1956)*
(Lithuania) Kaunas	Caunas (Portuguese)*, Kauen (German)*, Kovna - קובנה (Hebrew), Kauņa (Latvian)*, Kaunas (Azeri*, Finnish*, Lithuanian*, Romanian*, Serbian*, Swedish*, Turkish*), Kaunas - Каунас (Bulgarian*, Russian*), Kaunaseu / K'aunasŭ - 카우나스 (Korean)*, K'aunasi – კაუნასი (Georgian*), Kaunasu - カウナス (Japanese)*, Kauns (Samogitian)*, Koŭna - Коўна (Belarusian)*, Kovne - קאָװנע (Yiddish)*, Kovno (Czech)*, Kowno (Polish)*, kaonasi 考那斯 (Chinese)*, Cavm (former Latin, per Carta Marina)*.
(North Macedonia) Kavadarci	Kavadarci (English, Serbian, Croatian, Bosnian, Slovene), Кавадарци (Macedonian)
(Russia) Kazan	Cazã (Portuguese)*, Kazanj - Казань (Russian)*, Casan (Latin)*, Kasan (German)*, Kazan - カザン (Japanese)*, Kazan (Turkish)*, Kazań (Polish)*, Kazaņa (Latvian)*, Qazan (Azeri*, Tatar*), 喀山 (Chinese)*, ٌقازان (Arabic)*
(Russia) Kem	Kemj' - Кемь (Russian)*, Kemi* or Vienan Kemi* (Finnish)
(Finland) Kemi	Giepma (Northern Sami)*
(Ukraine) / (Autonomous Republic of Crimea) Kerch	Keriç (Crimean Tatar*), Kerç (Azeri*, Turkish*), Kerč, i.e. Kerch - Керч (Ukrainian)*, Kerč - Керчь (Russian)*, Kercz (Polish)*, Kerci (Romanian)*, Kertš (Finnish)*, Kertsch (German)*, Krč (older Croatian)*, 刻赤 (Chinese)*
(Netherlands) Kessel	Keselis (Lithuanian), Kessel (Dutch*)
(Poland) Kętrzyn	Kętrzyn (Polish)*, Rastenburg (German)*
(Slovakia) Kežmarok	Caesaropolis (Latin), Käsmark (Garman*), Kejmarok (Azerbaijani*), Kesmark (alternative German), Késmárk (Hungarian*), Kesmarkinum (alternative Latin) Kezmark – קעזמאַרק (Yiddish*), Kežmarok (Slovak*), Kežmarok – Кежмарок (Serbian*), Kežmaroka (Latvian*), Kežmarokas (Lithuanian*), Kieżmark (Polish*), Villa (Saxonum apud Ecclesiam) Sancte Elisabeth (alternative Latin)
(Ukraine) Kharkiv	Carcóvia (Portuguese)*, Charkov (Czech*, Slovak*), Charkovas (Lithuanian)*, Charkow (German), Charkiv / Charkov (Dutch)*, Charków (Polish)*, Hā'ěrkēfū - 哈尔科夫 (simplified) 哈爾科夫 (traditional) (Chinese), Hareukiu / Harŭk'iu - 하르키우 (Korean)*, Harkov (Romanian*, Serbian*, Slovene), Harkova (Latvian*, Finnish*), Harkov (Hungarian)*, Hárkovo - Χάρκοβο (Greek)*, Harukiu - ハルキウ (Japanese)*, Karkov (Turkish)*, Kharkiv - Харків (Ukrainian)*, Khark'ivi – ხარკივი (Georgian*), Kharkov or Khar'kov or Kharjkov - Харьков (Russian)*, خاركوف (Arabic)
(North Macedonia) Kičevo	Kërçovë (Albanian), Kičevo (English, Serbian, Croatian, Bosnian, Slovene), Kičevo - Кичево (Macedonian)
(Germany) Kiel	Kiel (Estonian*, Finnish*, German*, Hungarian*, Low Saxon*, Portuguese*, Romanian*, Spanish*, Swedish*, Turkish*), Kil (North Frisian)*, Ķīle (Latvian)*, K'ili – კილი (Georgian*), Kilonia (Polish)*, Kylis (Lithuanian)*, Quília (Portuguese, rare)*, Kielo - Κίελο (Greek)*, 基爾 (Chinese)
(Poland) Kielce	Kielce (Polish)*, Kelts - קעלץ (Yiddish)*, Keljcy - Кельцы*, Keljce - Кельце (Russian)*
(Serbia) Kikinda	Chichinda Mare (Romanian)*, Grosskikinda (German)*, Nagykikinda (Hungarian*)
(Turkey) Kırklareli	Kırkkilise (former Ottoman Turkish)*, Kırklareli (Turkish)*, Lozengrad - Лозенград (Bulgarian)*, Qırxlareli (Azeri)*, Saránda Eklisiés - Σαράντα Εκκλησιές* / Saránda Eklisíe - Σαράντα Ἐκκλησίαι* (Greek)
(Republic of Ireland) Kilkenny	Cill Chainnigh (Irish)*
(Republic of Ireland) Killarney	Cill Áirne (Irish)
(Russia) Kirov	Iljna - Ильна (historic Mari),^{[KNAB]} Iljna-ola - Ильна-ола (historic Mari),^{[KNAB]} Ilna - Илна (historic Meadow Mari), Ilna-ola - Илна-Ола (historic Meadow Mari), Jīluòfū - 基洛夫 (Mandarin Chinese*), Kiraŭ - Кіраў (Belarusian*), Kirov - Киров (Russian*),^{[KNAB]} Kirov - Кіров (Ukrainian*), Kirow (Polish*), Kīrofu - キーロフ (Japanese*), Kolın - Колын (historic Tatar), Kylno - Кылно (historic Udmurt),^{[KNAB]} Vatka - Ватка (historic Udmurt),^{[KNAB]} Vätka - Вятка (historic Tatar), Vjatka - Вятка (historic Russian [1780–1934]),^{[KNAB]} Vyatoka - ヴャトカ (historic Japanese*), Xlynov - Хлынов (historic Russian [ca. 1457–1780])^{[KNAB]}
(Sweden) Kiruna	Giron (Northern Sami)*, Gierun (Lule Sami), Kieruna (Meänkieli), Kiiruna (Finnish)*, Kiruna (Swedish)*, Kiruna / K'iruna - 키루나 (Korean)
(Austria) Klagenfurt	Clagenfurth (historic German), Klagenfurt (German*, Dutch*, Romanian*), Clanfurt (Friulian*), Celovec (Czech*, Slovene*), Kurāgenfuruto - クラーゲンフルト (Japanese)*, Želanec (alternative Czech name)*
(Lithuania) Klaipėda	Klaipeda (Estonian*, Finnish*), K'laip'eda – კლაიპედა (Georgian*), Klaipėda (Lithuanian*, Romanian*), Klaipēda (Latvian)*, Klaipieda (Samogitian)*, Klajpeda (Belarusian)*, Kłajpeda (Polish)*, Meemel (former Estonian)*, Memel* and Memelburg* (German), Mēmele (former Latvian)*
(Poland) Kłodzko	Kłodzko (Polish), Kladsko (Czech and Slovak), Klodzkas (Lithuanian), Glatz (German), Glacium or Glacensis urbs (Latin)
(Switzerland) Klosters	Claustra (Romansh), Claustra-Sernaus (alternative Romansh), Klosters (German)*, 克洛斯達斯 (Chinese)
(Netherlands) Klundert	Klundert (Dutch*), Klundertas (Lithuanian)
(Slovakia) Kolárovo	Guta (archaic Slovak), Gúta (Hungarian*), Gutta (archaic Hungarian), Kolarovas (Lithuanian*), Kolarovo (Serbo-Croatian*), Kolárovo (Slovak*), Kolārovo (Latvian*)
(Slovenia) Kobarid	Caporetto (Italian*, Romanian*), Cjaurêt (Friulian)*, Karfreit (German)*, Kobarid (Slovene)*
(Finland) Kokkola	Kokkola (Finnish), Karleby (Swedish), Gamlakarleby (old Swedish)
(Germany) Kolkwitz	Gołkojce (Lower Sorbian), Kolkwitz (Niederlausitz) (German)*
(Ukraine) Kolomyia	Colomeea (Romanian)*, Kilemey - קילעמײ (Yiddish)*, Kolomea (German)*, Kołomyja (Polish)*, Kolomyja - Коломия (Ukrainian)*, Kolomyja - Коломыя (Russian)*
(Slovakia) Komárno	Brigetio (archaic Latin), Comaromium (Latin), Comorra (alternative German), Komarnas (Lithuanian*), Komarno - Комарно (Bulgarian*), Komarno (Azerbaijani*), Komárno (Slovak*), Komārno (Latvian*), Komárom (Hungarian*), Komoran (Serbo-Croatian*), Komoran – Коморан (Serbain*), Komorn (German*), Öreg-komárom (alternative Hungarian), Révkomárom (alternative Hungarian)
(Hungary) Komárom	Brigetio (archaic Latin), Comaromium (Latin), Comorra (alternative German), Komárno (Slovak*), Komarom (Azerbaijani), Komárom (Hungarian*, Serbo-Croatian*), Komoran (Croatian*), Komarom – Комаром (Serbian*), Komorn (German*)
(Greece) Komotini	Gümülcine (Turkish)*, Komotini - Κομοτηνή (Greek)*, Gjumjurdžina – Гюмюрджина (Bulgarian)*, Comotena (Latin)*
(Russia) Kondopoga	Kondopoga - Кондопога (Russian)*, Kontupohja (Finnish)*
(Germany) Konstanz	Constance (French*, English variant*), Constança* / Constância* (Portuguese), Costanza (Italian)*, Konstanca (Serbian)*, Konstanca (Hungarian)*, Konstancja* / Konstanca* (Polish), Kostnice (Czech)*, Konstántza - Κωνστάντζα* / Konstandía - Κωνσταντία* (Greek), 康斯坦茨 (Chinese)
(Germany) Köpenick	Köpenick (German)*, Kopanica (Polish)*, Kopník (Czech)*
(Slovenia) Koper	Capodistria (Italian)*, Kopar (Croatian*, Serbian*), Koper (Slovene*, Hungarian *, Polish *), Cjaudistre (Friulian)*
(Albania) Korçë	Corizza (Italian)*, Görice (Turkish)*, Korča - Корча (Bulgarian)*, Korçë * / Korça* (Albanian), Koritsá - Κορυτσά (Greek)*
(Netherlands) Kortgene	Kortgene (Dutch*), Kortgenė (Lithuanian), Kortjeen (Zeelandic*)
(Belgium) Kortrijk	Contrai (Aragonese*), Cortoriacum (Latin*), Cortrique (Spanish*), Courtrai (alternative English*, French*, Italian*, Galician*, Lombard* alternative Portuguese), Courtray (alternative English), Cortrai (Occitan*), Kortreika (Latvian*) Kortreikas (Lithuanian*), Kortrejko (Esperanto*), Kortreyk (Azerbaijani), Kortriek (Zeelandic*), Kortrijk (Dutch*, Portuguese*), Kortryk (West Flemish*)
(Slovakia) Košice	Cassovia or Caschovia (Latin)*, Caşovia (old Romanian)*, Kassa (Hungarian)*, Cassovie (French)*, Kaschau (German)*, Kasha (Romani)*, Kashòy - קאַשוי (Yiddish), Košice (Czech*, Romanian*, Serbian*, Slovak*), Kösice (Turkish), Košycy - Кошицы, Košicе - Кошице (Russian*), Košyсe, i.e. Koshytse - Ко́шице (Ukrainian*), Košyсi, i.e. Koshytsi - Ко́шиці (older Ukrainian variant*), Koszyce (Polish)*, קושיצה (Hebrew)
Kosovo Polje	Amselfeld (German)*, Câmpia Mierlei (Romanian)*, Champ des merles (French)*, Fushë Kosova (Albanian)*, Kosova Ovası (Turkish), Kosovo Polje (Serbian*, Slovene), Kosowe Pole (Polish)*, Kosifopédhio - Κοσσυφοπέδιο (Greek)*, Merelveld (Afrikaans*, Dutch*), Rigómező (Hungarian, only in historic context)*
(Ukraine) Kostiantynivka	Костянтинівка (Ukrainian) *, Константиновка (Russian)*
(Montenegro) Kotor	Cátaro (Portuguese)*, Cattaro (Italian)*, Kotor (Croatian*, Serbian*)
(Ukraine) Kovel	Kovel' - Ковель (Russian*, Ukrainian*), Kovl - קאָװל (Yiddish)*, Kowel (Polish)*
(Greece) Kozani	Kozani - Κοζάνη (Greek)*, Kožani - Кожани (Bulgarian)*, Cojani (Aromanian), Kozan (Turkish)*
(Poland) Kraków	Cracovia (Latin, Italian*, Romanian*, Spanish*), Cracòvia (Catalan*), Cracóvia (Portuguese)*, Cracovie (French*), Cracow (English)*, Keurakupeu / K'ŭrak'up'ŭ - 크라쿠프 (Korean), Krakaŭ - Кракаў (Belarusian)*, Kraká (Icelandic)*, Krakau (Afrikaans*, Dutch*, German*), Krakiv - Краків (Ukrainian)*, Krakkó (Hungarian)*, Krakov (Croatian*, Czech*, Slovak*, Slovene*, Turkish*), Krakov - Краков (Bulgarian*, Russian*, Serbian*), Krakova (Latvian*, Finnish*), Krakovía - Κρακοβία (Greek)*, Krakovja (Maltese), Krakovo (Esperanto)*, Krakow (English)*, Kraków (Polish*, Swedish*), Krākūf - كراكوف (Arabic*, Persian*), Kroke - קראָקע (Yiddish)*, Krokuva (Lithuanian)*, Kurakufu - クラクフ (Japanese)*, K'rak'ovi – კრაკოვი (Georgian)*, 克拉科夫 (Kèlākēfu) (Chinese)*
(Slovakia) Kráľovský Chlmec	Királyhelmec (Hungarian*), Kraljovski Hlmec (Serbo-Croatian*), Kraljovski Hlmec – Краљовски Хлмец (Serbian*), Krāļovski Hlmeca (Latvian*), Kráľovský Chlmec (Slovak*)
(Slovakia) Krásno nad Kysucou	Karásznó (Hungarian*), Krásno nad Kysucou (Slovak*), Krásno nad Kysucou – Красно над Кисуцоу (Serbian*), Krāsno pie Kisucas (Latvian*)
(Slovakia) Kremnica	Cremnicia (Latin*), Körmöcbánya (Hungarian*), Kremnica (Slovak*), Kremnjica (Serbo-Croatian*), Kremnjica – Кремњица (Serbian*), Kremnitsa (Azerbaijani*), Kremnitz (German*)
(Sweden) Kristianstad	Christianstad (Danish)*, Christianstadt (former German)*, Kristianstad (German*, Swedish*), Kristianstadas (Lithuanian)*
(Finland) Kristinestad	Christinae Stadh (former Swedish)*, Kristiinankaupunki (Finnish)*, Kristinestad (Swedish)*, Kristingrad - Кристинград (Serbian)*, Krinstianstad (Polish)*
(Czech Republic) Krnov	Carnovia (Latin)*, Jägerndorf (German)*, Karniów (former Polish)*, Krnov (Czech)*, Krnów (Polish)*
(Slovakia) Krompachy	Krombach (German*), Korompa (Hungarian*), Krompachy (Slovak*), Krompahi (Latvian*, Serbo-Croatian*), Krompahi – Кромпахи (Serbian*)
(Ukraine) Kropyvnytskyi	Kropõvnõtskõi (Estonian)*, Kropyvnyc’kyj – Кропивницький (Ukrainian)*
(Slovakia) Krupina	Karpfen (German*), Korpona (Hungarian*), Krupina (Slovak*), Krupina – Крупина (Serbian*)
(Poland) Kudowa-Zdrój	Bad Kudowa (German)*, Chudoba (Czech)*, Kudowa-Zdrój (Polish)*
(North Macedonia) Kumanovo	Kumanovo (English, Serbian, Croatian, Bosnian, Slovene), Kumanowo (Polish)* Kumanovo - Куманово (Macedonian)
(Estonia) Kuressaare	Arensburg (former German*, former Swedish*), Kuressaari (Finnish)*
(Poland) Kwidzyn	Kwidzyn (Polish)*, Marienwerder (German)*
(Ukraine) Kyiv	Chiu (old Romanian), Cív (Irish), Jīfǔ - 基辅 (simplified) 基輔 (traditional) (Chinese), Kænugarður (Icelandic)*, Kíiv or Kíev (Catalan), Kiefu - キエフ / Kīu - キーウ (Japanese)*, Kiëv (Dutch)*, Kiev (Interlingua, Italian*, Maltese, Portuguese*, Romanian*, Spanish*, Swedish*, Turkish*), Kiev - קיִעװ (Yiddish)*, Kijeŭ - Кіеў (Belarusian)*, K'ievi – კიევი (Georgian*), Kíevo - Κίεβο (Greek)*, Kiew (German)*, Kiiev (Estonian)*, Kijev (Croatian*, Hungarian*, Serbian*, Slovene*), Kijeva (Latvian)*, Kijevas (Lithuanian)*, Kiyev (Azeri)*, Kijów (Polish)*, Kiova (Finnish)*, Kiyepeu / K'iyep'ŭ - 키예프 (Korean), Kiyev - Киев (Russian)*, Kīyif - كييف (Arabic), Kyjev (Czech*, Slovak*), Kyyiv, Kyiv - Київ (Ukrainian*), Kiev - Киев (Macedonian*), Kiōvia (Latin), Qiyev - קייב (Hebrew)*, Quieve (Portuguese variant)*
(United Kingdom) (Scotland) Kyle of Lochalsh	Caol Loch Aillse (Scots Gaelic)*, Kayl Oyfn Loch (Yiddish)
(Cyprus) / (Northern Cyprus) Kyrenia	Cirénia / Cirênia (Portuguese)*, Girne (Turkish)*, Kerínia - Κερύνεια (Greek)*
(Slovakia) Kysucké Nové Mesto	Kischützneustadt (German*), Kisucke Nove Mestas (Lithuanian*), Kisucke Nove Mesto (Latvian*), Kiszucaújhely (Hungarian*), Kysucké Nové Mesto (Slovak*), Oberneustadl (alternative German)

== L ==
English name	Other names or former names
(Croatia) Labin	Albona (Italian), Labin - Лабин (Croatian, Serbian, Russian)
(Finland) Lahti	Lahti (Estonian, Finnish, Romanian, Slovene, Polish), Laht'i – ლაჰტი (Georgian), Lahtis (Swedish)
(Belarus) Lakhva	Łachwa (Polish), Lahva – Лахва (Belarusian, Russian), לחווא (Hebrew), לאַכװע (Yiddish)
(Belgium) La Louvière	El Louviére (alternative Walloon*), El Lovire (Picard*, Walloon*), La Louvière (French*), Laluvjēra (Latvian*), La Luvjeras (Lithuanian*), Lovaria (alternative Latin*), Luparia (Latin*)
(Belgium) Landen	Landae (Latin), Landen (Dutch*), Landenas (Lithuanian), Londe (Walloon)
(Netherlands) Langedijk	Langediek (Low Saxon*), Langedijk (Dutch*), Langedyk (Western Frisian*),
(Finland) Lappeenranta	Lappeenranta (Estonian, Finnish), Villmanstrand (Swedish)
(Italy) L'Aquila	after 1939 Àquëlë or L'Aquila (Neapolitan*), Aquila or Aquilana civitas (Latin*), Áquila (Portuguese*), L'Àcuiła or Ł'Aquiła (Venetian*), L'Àgogia (Ligurian*), L'Akuila (Azerbaijani*), L'Akvila (Latvian*, Lithuanian*), Lakvila (Albanian*), L'Aquila (Italian*, Basque*, Breton*, Bosnian*, Catalan*, Croatian*, Czech*, Danish*, Dutch*, Estonian*, Finnish*, French*, Galician*, German*, Hungarian*, Irish*, Luxembourgish*, North Frisian*, Norwegian*, Norwegian Nynorsk*, Occitan*, Polish*, Romanian*, Scots*, Serbo-Croatian*, Slovak*, Slovenian*, Spanish*, Swedish*, Turkish*, Welsh*, West Frisian*), La-Aglo (Esperanto*), Λ' Άκουιλα (Greek*), Акуила (Bulgarian*), Л’Акуіла (Belarusian*), Л'Акуила (Chechen*, Kazakh*, Tatar*), Л’А́куила or Аквила or Акуила or Л’Аквила (Russian*, Sakha*), Л’Акуилæ (Ossetic*), Л’Аквила (Serbian*), L'Ákvila - Л'А́квіла or L'Ákujila - Л'А́куїла (Ukrainian*), Լ'Աքվիլա (Armenian*), L’ak'vila – ლ’აკვილა (Georgian*) between 1863 and 1939 Aquila degli Abruzzi (Italian*, Czech*, Norwegian*, Norwegian Nynorsk*, Slovak*), Aquila or Aquila Aprutiorum or Aquilia or Aquila in Vestinis or Aquilana civitas (Latin*), Áquila (Portuguese*), Akvila djel'i Adrucci - Аквила дельи Абруцци (Russian*) before 1863 Aquila (Italian*, Czech*, Norwegian*, Slovak*), Aquila or Aquilia or Aquila in Vestinis or Aquilana civitas or Avella or Avia or Furconia or Furconium (Latin*), Áquila (Portuguese*), Akvila - Аквила (Russian*)
(Belgium) La Roche-en-Ardenne	La Roche-en-Ardenne (French*, German*, Luxembourgish*), Li Rotche (Walloon*), Rupes Ardennae (Latin), Welschenfels (alternative German*), Welsch Fiels (archaic Luxembourgish*)
(Switzerland) Lausanne	Lausana (Catalan, Portuguese*, Spanish*), Lausanne (Dutch*, French*, Finnish*, German*, Romanian*, Swedish*), Laŭzano (Esperanto)*, Losena (Arpitan*), Losanen (former German)*, Losanna (Italian*, Romansh*), Lozan (Armenian, Turkish*), Lozana – ლოზანა (Georgian*), Lozana (Serbian), Lozáni – Λωζάνη (Greek)*, Lozanna (Latvian*, Polish*), Luzana (Slovene)*, Rojan - 로잔 (Korean)*, Rōzannu – ローザンヌ (Japanese)*, 洛桑 (Chinese)*
(Poland) Lębork	Lauenburg (German), Lębork (Polish), Lãbòrg (Kashubian)
(Netherlands) Leerdam	Leardam (Western Frisian*), Leerdam (Dutch*), Leêrdam (Zeelandic*), Lerdamas (Lithuanianà
(Netherlands) Leeuwarden	Leeuwarden (Dutch*), Leovardia (Latin*), Leuvarden (Azerbaijani*), Leuvardena (Latvian*), Leuvardenas (Lithuanian*), Lewardum (alternative Latin), Liwwadden (Low German*, Low Saxon*, Town Frisian), Ljouwert (Western Frisian*)
(Italy) Leghorn	Liorna (Spanish), Livorno (Dutch, Finnish, German, Italian, Maltese, Portuguese, Romanian), Livórno – Λιβόρνο (Greek), Livorno - ליוורנו or ליבורנו (Hebrew), Livourne (French)
(Poland) Legnica	Legnica (Polish), Lehnice (Czech), Liegnitz (Dutch, German)
(United Kingdom) (England) Leicester	Caerlŷr (Welsh), Leicestria (Church Latin), L'sesteh (Yiddish), Ratae (Latin), لستر (Persian), Lestera (Latvian), 萊斯特 (Mandarin Chinese), 李斯特 (Cantonese), レスター (Japanese)
(Germany) Leipzig	Laiptsigi – ლაიფციგი (Georgian*), Lajpcig (Serbian), Lajpcyg – Ляйбцыґ (Belarusian), Leipciga (Latvian), Leipcigas (Lithuanian), Leipsic (older English), Leipsick (former French), Leipzig (Dutch, Finnish, French, German, Romanian, Slovene, Swedish, Turkish), Lejpcigo (Esperanto), Lepsiko (Esperanto) Lipcse (Hungarian), Lipsca (old Romanian), Lipsía – Λειψία (Greek), Lipsia (Italian, Latin, Old Castilian*), Lípsia (Portuguese), Lipsk (Lower Sorbian, Polish), Lipsko (Czech, Slovak), Raipeuchihi / Raip'ŭch'ihi – 라이프치히 (Korean), 萊比錫 (Chinese), Raiputsihi – ライプツィヒ (Japanese)*
(Slovakia) Leopoldov	Leopold-Neustadtl (alternative German), Leopold Mestičko (archaic Slovak), Leopoldstadt (German*), Leopoldov (Slovak*), Leopoldova (Latvian*), Lipótvár (alternative Hungarian), Újvároska (Hungarian*)
(Belgium) Le Rœulx	El Rû (Picard, Walloon*), Le Rœulx (French*), Rodium (Latin)
(Belgium) Lessines	Lessen (Dutch*, Limburgish*, Zeelandic*), Lessin (Azerbaijani), Lessines (French*), Lessinia (Latin*), Lissene (Picard*, Walloon*)
(Belgium) Leuven	Lēfen (Anglo-Saxon*), Leuven (Dutch*), Leuve (Limburgish*), Lēvena (Latvian*), Levenas (Lithuanian*), Louvain (alternative English*, French*), Lováin (Irish*), Lovaina (Basque*, Catalan*, Galician, Occitan*, Portuguese*, Spanish*, Venetian), Lovaň (Czech*), Lovanio (Italian*), Loveno (Esperanto*), Löwen (German*), Lööwen (Northern Frisian*), Louvéni – Λέβεν (Greek*), Vî-Lovén (Walloon*), Léiwen (Luxembourgish*), Lovanium (Latin*), Lowanium (Polish*), 鲁汶 (Chinese*)
(Belgium) Leuze-en-Hainaut	Leuze-e-Hinnot (Walloon*), Leuze-en-Hainaut (French*), Leuze-in-Hénau (Picard*), Lutosa (Latin)
(Slovakia) Levice	Léva (Hungarian*), Leve (Turkish*), Levice (Slovak*), Levicė (Lithuanian*), Lеvitsе (Azerbaijani*), Lewenz (German*), Ljevice (Serbo-Croatian*), Ljevice – Љевице (Serbian*)
(Slovakia) Levoča	Lőcse (Hungarian*), Leutschau (German*), Leutsovia (Latin), Levoča (Slovak*), Levoça (Azerbaijani*), Lewocza (Polish*), Ljevoča – Љевоча (Serbian*)
(Netherlands) Leyden	Lajden (Serbo-Croatian*), Lêda (Arpitan*), Leida (Corsican, Italian*, Latin*, Portuguese*, Venetian*), Lèida (Occitan*, Piedmontese*), Leiden (Dutch*), Leidenas (Lithuanian*), Leidene (Latvian*), Leidn (Low Saxon*), Leien (Western Frisian*), Lejda (Hungarian*, Polish*), Lejden (Albanian*), Lejdeno (Esperanto*), Leyde (French*), Leyden (Anglo-Saxon*, Azerbaijani*, English), Leydn (West Flemish*), Reiden – 레이덴 (Korean), 莱頓 (Chinese)
(Albania) Lezhë	Lezhë / Lezha (Albanian), Alessio (Italian), Lješ Љеш (Serbian, Montenegrin)
(Czech Republic) Liberec	Reichenberg (German)
(Belgium) Libramont-Chevigny	Libråmont (Walloon*), Libramont-Chevigny (French*)
(Belgium) Liège	Liège (French, Hungarian, Swedish), Lîdje / Lîdge (Walloon), Léck (Luxembourgish), Lēodic (Anglo-Saxon*), Leodium (Latin), L'ež – Льеж (Russian), Liege (Finnish, Romanian, Swedish, Turkish), Liége (former French, Portuguese), Liegi (Italian), Lieĝo (Esperanto), Lieja (Catalan, archaic Portuguese, Spanish), Λιέγη (Greek), Liež – Лиеж (Bulgarian), Liež - Лиеж (Serbian), Lježa (Latvian), Lježas (Lithuanian), Liezhi – ლიეჟი (Georgian*), Luik (Afrikaans, Dutch), Lutych (Czech), Lüttich (German), Luuk (Limburgish), Rieju – 리에주 (Korean), ولييج (Arabic), ליאז (Hebrew), Riēju – リエージュ (Japanese)*, 列日 (Chinese)*
(Latvia) Liepāja	Lėipuojė (Samogitian)*, Lepai (Veps)*, Libau (German),^{[KNAB]} Libav (historic Veps), Libava – Либава (historic Russian),^{[KNAB]} Libava – Лібава (historic Belaussian, historic Ukrainian), Libave – ליבאַװע (Yiddish), Liepai (alternative Veps), Liep'aia – ლიეპაია (Georgian*), Liepāja (Estonian*, Finnish*, Latvian*,^{[KNAB]} Romanian*), Liepaja - Лиепая (Russian)*,^{[KNAB]} Liepaja - Ліепая (Belarusian)*, Lijepaja - Лієпая (Ukrainian)*, Līepõ (Livonian),^{[KNAB]} Liepoja (Lithuanian)*,^{[KNAB]} Liibavi (historic Estonian),^{[KNAB]} Liibo (Estonian variant),^{[KNAB]} Liibu (Estonian variant),^{[KNAB]} Liibuse (Estonian variant),^{[KNAB]} Liipavi (Estonian variant),^{[KNAB]} Lipawa (Polish)*,^{[KNAB]} Līpuoja (Latgalian), Lìyēpàyà - 利耶帕亞 (Mandarin Chinese)*, Riepāya - リエパーヤ (Japanese)*
(Belgium) Lier	Lier (Dutch*), Lierre (French*, Occitan*), Lire (Latvian*), Lyras (Lithuanian*)
(France) Lille	Lila (Portuguese, rare)*, Lille (French, Finnish, German, Latvian, Portuguese, Romanian), Rijsel (Dutch), Lil (Serbian), Lilla (Catalan, Italian), Lillo (Esperanto), Ryssel (former German), Λίλλη (Greek), 里爾 (Chinese), Lili – ლილი (Georgian*), Ril - 릴 (Korean)*
(France) Limoges	Lemòtges / Limòtges (Occitan), Llemotges (Catalan)*, Limož (Serbian), 列摩日 (Chinese)
(Cyprus) Limassol	Lemesos – Λεμεσός (Greek), Leymosun (obsolete Turkish), Limasol (Turkish), Limisso (Venetian/Italian)
(Belgium) Limbourg	Limbôr (Walloon*), Limbourg (French*), Limburgum (Latin), Limburg (Dutch*, Limburgish*, Zeelandic*), Limburgo (Galician, Italian*, Spanish*)
(Republic of Ireland) Limerick	Limeriko (Esperanto), Luimneach (Irish), Luimneach (Scottish Gaelic)*, 利默里克 (Chinese)
(United Kingdom) (England) Lincoln	Lindum or Lindum Colonia (Latin), Linkolnas (Lithuanian), Linkolna (Latvian), Ringikana (Māori)
(Sweden) Linköping	Lincopia (Latin), Lincopinga (Portuguese, rare)*, Linköping (Danish, Finnish, Swedish), 林雪平 (Chinese)
(Austria) Linz	Lentia (Latin), Linca (Latvian), Líncia (Portuguese)*, Linec (Czech), Lintsi – ლინცი (Georgian*), Linz (Catalan, German, Finnish, Romanian, Serbian, Slovene), Rincheu / Rinch'ŭ – 린츠 (Korean), 林茨 (Chinese)
(Slovakia) Lipany	Lipany (Slovak*), Lipani (Latvian*, Serbo-Croatian*), Lipani – Липани (Serbian*), Septemtiliae (Latin), Siebenlinden (German*), Héthárs (Hungarian*)
(Slovakia) Liptovský Hrádok	Liptau-Hradek (alternative German), Liptóújvár (Hungarian*), Liptovski Hrādoka (Latvian*), Liptovský Hrádok (Slovak*), Liptowski Gródek (Polish*), Neuhäusel in der Liptau (German*)
(Slovakia) Liptovský Mikuláš	Liptau-Sankt-Nikolaus (German*), Liptószentmiklós (Hungarian*), Liptovski Mikulaš (Serbo-Croatian*), Liptovski Mikulaš – Липтовски Микулаш (Serbian*), Liptovski Mikulaş (Azerbaijani*), Liptowski Mikułasz (Polish*), Liptovský Mikuláš (Slovak*), Liptovski Mikulāša (Latvian*), Liptovsky Mikulašas (Lithuanian*), Liptovský Svätý Mikuláš (archaic Slovak), Sankt Nikolaus in der Liptau (alternative German)
(Portugal) Lisbon	Liospóin (Irish), Lisabon (Croatian, Czech, Serbian, Slovak), Lisabona (Latvian, Lithuanian, Romanian), Lisaboni – ლისაბონი (Georgian*), Lisban - ලිස්බන් (Sinhala), Lisboa (Catalan*, Ladino, Portuguese, Spanish, Tagalog*, Norwegian), Lisbona (Arpitan*, Italian, Maltese), Lisbonne (French), Lisbono (Esperanto), Lišbūna, Lashbuna, Lishbuna, Ushbuna, al-Ushbuni (Arabic), Lissabon (Azeri, Danish, Dutch, Estonian, Finnish, German, Russian, Swedish), Lissavóna – Λισσαβώνα (Greek), Lisszabon (Hungarian), Lizbon (Armenian, Turkish), Lizbona (Polish, Slovene), Riseubon / Risŭbon – 리스본 (Korean), Risubon – リスボン (Japanese)*, Ushbune (old Arabic), Lǐsīběn – 里斯本 (Chinese), ليسبون (Persian), Olisīpō (Latin), Olissipōn - Ὀλισσιπών (Ancient Greek) Wliksybama / Vvlixibama (Old Frisian)
(United Kingdom) (England) Liverpool	Learpholl (Irish), Lerphoyll (Manx), Lerpwl (Welsh), Liverpul (Portuguese, rare)*, Liverpūle (Latvian), Liverpulis (Lithuanian), Liverpulo (Esperanto), Llynlleifiad (former Welsh), Poll a' Ghrùthain (Scottish Gaelic)*, Ribapūru – リバプール (Japanese)*, Ribeopul / Ribŏp'ul – 리버풀 (Korean), 利物浦 (Chinese), ليورپول (Persian), Liverp'uli – ლივერპული (Georgian*), Libharpul – লিভারপুল (Bengali),
(Slovenia) Ljubljana	Laibach (German), Liubliana (Portuguese, Romanian, Spanish), Lublanë (Albanian), Liublijana (Lithuanian), Liúibleána (Irish), Liyūbliyānā (Arabic), Ljubljana (Catalan, Croatian, Dutch, Finnish, French, Hungarian, Maltese, Serbian, Slovene, Swedish), Ljubljana – Љубљана (Macedonian, Serbian), Lubiana (Italian), Lubjanë (Albanian), Lyublyana (Azeri), Lublaň (Czech), Ļubļana (Latvian), Lublana (Polish), Ľubľana (Slovak), Lubliyana (Turkish), Lioubliána – Λιουμπλιάνα (Greek), Liubliana – Люблянa (Russian), Ryubeullyana / Ryubŭllyana - 류블랴나 (Korean)*, Ryuburyana – リュブリャナ (Japanese)*, 盧布爾雅那 (Chinese)*, Liubliana – ლიუბლიანა (Georgian*), Liubliyana – লিউব্লিয়ানা (Bengali),
(Spain) Lleida	Ilerda (Latin), Iltirda / Ildirda (Iberian), Larida (Arabic), Leida (Aragonese), Ļeida (Latvian), Lerida (Italian, Romanian), Lérida (French, Portuguese, Spanish), Lhèida (Occitan), Lleida (Catalan, Finnish)
(Germany) Löbau	Löbau (German), Lubij (Upper Sorbian), Lubiniec (Polish)
(Netherlands) Lochem	Lochem (Dutch*), Lochemas (Lithuanian)
(Poland) Łódź	Lodsch (German variant), Łódź (Polish), Lodz (German variant), former name:Litzmannstadt (German, 1940–1945), Lodzh - לאדזש (Yiddish), Lodzi – ლოძი (Georgian*), Lodzia (Latin), Lodž, (Slovene), 罗兹 (Chinese)
(Belgium) Lokeren	Lokern (Zeelandic*), Lokeren (Dutch*), Lokerena (Latvian*), Lokerenas (Lithuanian*)
(Belgium) Lommel	Lomela (Latvian*), Lomelis (Lithuanian*), Lommel (Dutch*)
(United Kingdom) (England) London	Landan - ලන්ඩන් (Sinhala), (Llundain (Welsh), Londër (Albanian), Londain (Irish), London (Azeri, Hungarian), Londan – Лёндан (Belarusian), Londe (Limburgish), Londen (Afrikaans, Dutch, Frisian), Londhíno – Λονδίνο (Greek), Londinium (Latin), Londona (Latvian), Londonas (Lithuanian), Londono (Esperanto), London (German), Londoni – ლონდონი (Georgian*), Londra (Albanian, Italian, Maltese, Romanian, Romansh, Turkish), Londres (Catalan, French, Ladino, Portuguese, Spanish, Tagalog*), Londrez (Breton), Londro (Arpitan*), Londyn (Polish), Londýn (Czech, Slovak), Lontoo (Finnish), Loundres (Cornish), Luân Đôn (Vietnamese), Lundenwic (Anglo-Saxon), Lúndūn – 伦敦 (simplified) 倫敦 (traditional) (Chinese), Lundúnir (Icelandic), Lunnainn (Scottish Gaelic), Lunnin (Manx), Reondeon / Rŏndŏn – 런던 (Korean), Rondon – ロンドン (Japanese)*, لندن (Arabic, Persian, Urdu), Lontuni (tswana, sotho, zulu), London - Лондон (Bulgaria)
(United Kingdom) Londonderry	see Derry
(France) Longwy	Longwy (French), Langich (German), Lonkech or Lonkesch (Luxembourgish)
(France) Lourdes	Lorda (Catalan, Occitan), Lourde (Provençal), Lourdes (French, Finnish, Irish, Italian, Maltese, Portuguese, Romanian), Lurda (Basque), Lurdes (Portuguese variant)*, Lurds - ලූර්ඩ්ස් (Sinhala), Lurdy (Czech), Lourdē - Λούρδη (Greek – καθαρεύουσα)
(Belgium) Lo-Reninge	Loa et Rinenga (Latin), Loo-Reninghe (alternative French*), Lo-Renienge (Zeelandic*), Lo-Rênienge (West Flemish*), Lo-Reninge (Dutch*, French*)
(Germany) Lübben	Lübben (German), Lubin (Lower Sorbian, Polish)
(Germany) Lübbenau	Lübbenau (German), Lubnjow (Lower Sorbian)
(Germany) Lübeck	Libek (Serbian), Lībeka (Latvian), Liubekas (Lithuanian), Lubecca (Italian), Lübeck (French, German, Low Saxon, Romanian, Swedish), Lubek (Czech), Lubeka (Polish), Lubeque (Portuguese), Lüübek (Estonian), Lyypekki (Finnish), Λυβέκη (Greek – καθαρεύουσα), Liubice (old Slavic name)*, Lybæk (former Danish), Rwibekeu / Rwibek'ŭ – 뤼베크 (Korean), 呂貝克 (Chinese)
(Poland) Lublin	Civitas Lublinensis (Latin), Liublinas (Lithuanian), Ljublin – Люблин (Bulgarian, Russian), Lublin – Лублин (Macedonian), Lublino (Italian), Ļubļina (Latvian), Люблін (Belarusian, Ukrainian), לובלין (Hebrew), Ruburin – ルブリン (Japanese)*, 盧布林 (Chinese)
(Italy) Lucca	Luca (Portuguese), Lucca (Catalan, Dutch, German, Italian, Romanian), Lucques (French), Luka – Лука (Bulgarian), Lukka (Polish)
(Slovakia) Lučenec	Lashantz – לאשאנץ (Yiddish*), Lizenz (German*), Losonc (Hungarian*), Lučenec (Slovak*), Lučeneca (Latvian*), Lučenecas (Lithuanian*), Luçеnеts (Azerbaijani*), Lučenjec (Serbo-Croatian*), Lučenjec – Лучењец (Serbian*), Łuczeniec (Polish*), Lutetia Hungarorum (Latin)
(Switzerland) Lucerne	Liucerna (Lithuanian), Lucern (Czech, Serbian, Slovene), Lucerna (Italian, Latvian, Polish, Portuguese, Romanian, Romansh, Spanish), Lucerne (French), Lukérni – Λουκέρνη (Greek), Lutsèrna (Arpitan*), Luzern (Afrikaans, Dutch, Finnish, German, Serbian, Swedish, Turkish), Luzerna (Basque, Catalan), Ruchereun / Ruch'erŭn – 루체른 (Korean)
(Switzerland) Lugano	Lügan (Lombard), Lauis (old German), Ligiaun (Romansh), Lugano (Catalan, French, German, Italian, Maltese, Spanish, Portuguese*), Rugano – 루가노 (Korean)
(Ukraine) Luhansk	Lugansk – Луганск (Russian)*, Luhansk'i – ლუჰანსკი (Georgian*), Voroshilovgrad (1935–1958, 1970–1990)
(Romania) Lugoj	Logoş (Turkish), Lugoj (French*, Italian*, Romanian*), Lugos (Hungarian)*, Lugoš – Лугош or Lugož – Лугож (Serbian)*, Lugosch (German)*, Lugozh – Лугож (Russian)*
(Sweden) Luleå	Julevu (Lule Sami), Liuleo (Lithuanian*), Louléo – Λουλέο (Greek*), Lula (Latin*), Luleå (Swedish*), Lulėja (alternative Lithuanian), Luleju (Northern Sami*), Luleo (Azerbaijani*) – Лулео (Macedonian*, Russian*, Serbian*, Ukrainian*), Lūleo (Latvian*), Luulaja (Finnish*, Meänkieli), Lüvllege (Ume Sami), Rureo – ルレオ (Japanese*)
(Sweden) Lund	Lund (Danish, French, German, Swedish), Lunda (Latin, Latvian), 隆德 (Chinese), Lundur (Icelandic)
(Germany) Lüneburg	Lüneburch (Low Saxon), Lunebourg (French), Lüneburg (German, Romanian), Luneburgo (Italian, Portuguese), Lunenburg (Dutch, variant in English), 呂內堡 (Chinese)
(Ukraine) Lutsk	Luckas (Lithuanian), Lucjk – Луцьк (Ukrainian), Luţk (Romanian), Luc'k (Italian), Łuck (Polish) Luzk (German), Loytsk, Loutsk (Yiddish)
Luxembourg	Lëtzebuerg (Luxembourgish), Liuksemburgas (Lithuanian), Ljuksemburg – Люксембург (Bulgarian, Russian), Ljuksemburh (Ukrainian), Lucemburk (Czech), Lucsamburg (Irish, Scottish Gaelic), Lục Xâm Bảo (Vietnamese), Luksemboarch (Frisian), Luksemburg – Люксэмбурґ(Belarusian), Luksemburg (Croatian, Polish, Serbian, Slovene), Luksemburg - Луксембург (Macedonian), Lüksemburg (Turkish), Luksemburga (Latvian), Luksemburgi – ლუქსემბურგი (Georgian*), Luksemburgo (Esperanto, Ladino), Lussemburgo (Italian), Lussemburgu (Maltese), Lussimbork (Walloon), Lützelburg (former German), Luxembôrg (Arpitan*), Luxemborg / Luxembourg / Luxemburg (Danish), Luxembourg (Estonian, French, Hungarian), Lúxemborg (Icelandic), Luxemburg (Afrikaans, Basque variant, Catalan, Dutch, English variant, Finnish, German, Romanian, Slovak, Swedish), Luxemburgia (Latin variant), Luxemburgo (Portuguese, Spanish), Luxemburgum (Latin), Luxemvúrgho – Λουξεμβούργο (Greek), Luxenburgo (Basque), Lwcsembwrg (Welsh), Ruksembureukeu / Ruksemburŭk'ŭ – 룩셈부르크 (Korean), Rukusemburuku – ルクセンブルク (Japanese)*, 盧森堡 (Chinese), লাক্সেমবার্গ - Lakshembarg' (Bengali)
(Ukraine) Lviv	Lwów (Polish), İlbav (Crimean Tatar), Ilov (Armenian), Ilyvó (old Hungarian), Lavov (Croatian, Serbian), Lemberg or Leopoldstadt (archaic) (German, former Hungarian), Lemberg – לעמבערג or Lemberik – לעמבעריק (Yiddish), Leópolis – Λεόπολις (Greek – καθαρεύουσα), Léopol (French), Leopoli (Italian), Leopolis (Latin), Leópolis (Spanish, Portuguese*), Levov – לבוב (Hebrew), Liov (Romanian), Lìwòfū – 利沃夫 (Chinese (China)), Liweifu - 利維夫 (Chinese (Taiwan)), Lvoŭ – Львоў (Belarusian), Lvov (Czech, Slovene), Lvovas (Lithuanian), L'viv – Львів (Ukrainian), Lvivi – ლვივი (Georgian*), L'vov – Львов (Russian), Ľvov (Slovak), Ļvova, Ļviva (Latvian), Ribiu - 리비우 (Korean)*, Riviu - リヴィウ(Japanese)
(Sweden) Lycksele	Liksjoe, (Southern Sami), Lïkssjuo (Northern Sami*, Ume Sami), Lycksele (Swedish*)
(France) Lyon	León de Francia (former Spanish), Lião (Portuguese, rare)*, 里昂 (Chinese), Lionas (Lithuanian), Lió (Catalan), Lión – Λυών (Greek), Λούγδουνον (Greek – καθαρεύουσα), Liona (Latvian), Lione (Italian), Liono (Esperanto), Lion (Azeri, Serbian), Lioni – ლიონი (Georgian*), Liyon (Arpitan*, Turkish), Ludgun or Lwów francuski (former Polish), Lugdunum or Lugudunum (Latin), Lyon (Dutch, Finnish, French, German, Romanian, Slovene), Lyón (Spanish), Lyons (former English), Riong – 리옹 (Korean), Riyon – リヨン (Japanese)*
