= Yassi =

Yassi may refer to:

== People ==
=== Given name ===
- Yassi Ashki (born 1981), Iranian health activist and the founder of RAH Foundation and Ctrl+S website
- Yassi Mazandi, Iranian sculptor, painter and social activist
- Yassi Pressman (born 1995), Filipina actress, singer and dancer

=== Surname ===
- Annalee Yassi, Canadian health scholar
- Marie Yassi (born 1985), Ivorian footballer

== Places ==
- Yassi Ada, island off the coast of Bodrum, Turkey and area of the Mediterranean Sea

== Others ==
- Comunidad Inti Wara Yassi, Bolivian non-governmental organization

== See also ==
- Battle of Yassıçemen
- Yasi
- Yassy (disambiguation)
