= Yasi =

Yasi may refer to:

== Cyclones ==
- Cyclone Yasi (1996), a tropical storm that brought heavy rainfall to Tonga.
- Cyclone Yasi, a Category 4 tropical cyclone that caused significant damage in Queensland, Australia in 2011.

== Other uses ==
- Turkestan (city), of which Yasi is the historical name
- YASI, a summer program at Rhode Island's Trinity Repertory Company
- S. yasi, a species of Santalum

== See also ==
- Iasi (disambiguation)
- Yassi (disambiguation)
- Yassy (disambiguation)
