= Lassy =

Lassy is the name of several communes in France:

- Lassy, Ille-et-Vilaine, in the Ille-et-Vilaine département
- Lassy, Calvados, in the Calvados département
- Lassy, Val-d'Oise, in the Val-d'Oise département

People named Lassy:

- Ivar Lassy (1889–1939), Finnish writer and anthropologist
- Timo Lassy (b. 1974), Finnish musician
- Lassy Marquez (b. 1976), Filipino comedian

== See also ==
- Lassi (disambiguation)
- Lassie (disambiguation)
