= Härma, Hiiu County =

Village in Estonia

Härma
- Village
- Location within Estonia
- Coordinates: 58°47′54″N 22°28′13″E
- Country: Estonia
- County: Hiiu County
- Parish: Hiiumaa Parish
- Time zone: UTC+2 (EET)
  - Summer (DST): UTC+3 (EEST)

Härma is a village in Hiiumaa Parish, Hiiu County in northwestern Estonia.

The village was first mentioned in 1798 (Herma). Historically, the village was part of Emmaste Manor (German: Emmast).

From 1977 to 1997, Härma was part of the village of Kaderna.
