= Lassi (disambiguation) =

Lassi is a yoghurt-based drink of South Asia.

Lassi may also refer to:

- Lassi, Kefalonia, town in Kefalonia, Greece
- Lassi, Hiiu County, village in Emmaste Parish, Hiiu County, Estonia
- Lassi, Saare County, village in Salme Parish, Saare County, Estonia
- Lassi people, an ethnic group of Pakistan
- Lassi dialect, spoken in Pakistan
- Mehrullah Lassi, Pakistani boxer

== See also ==
- Laasi, a village in Estonia
- Lasi (disambiguation)
- Lassy (disambiguation)
- Lassie (disambiguation)
