= Sõru =

Village in Estonia

- Village
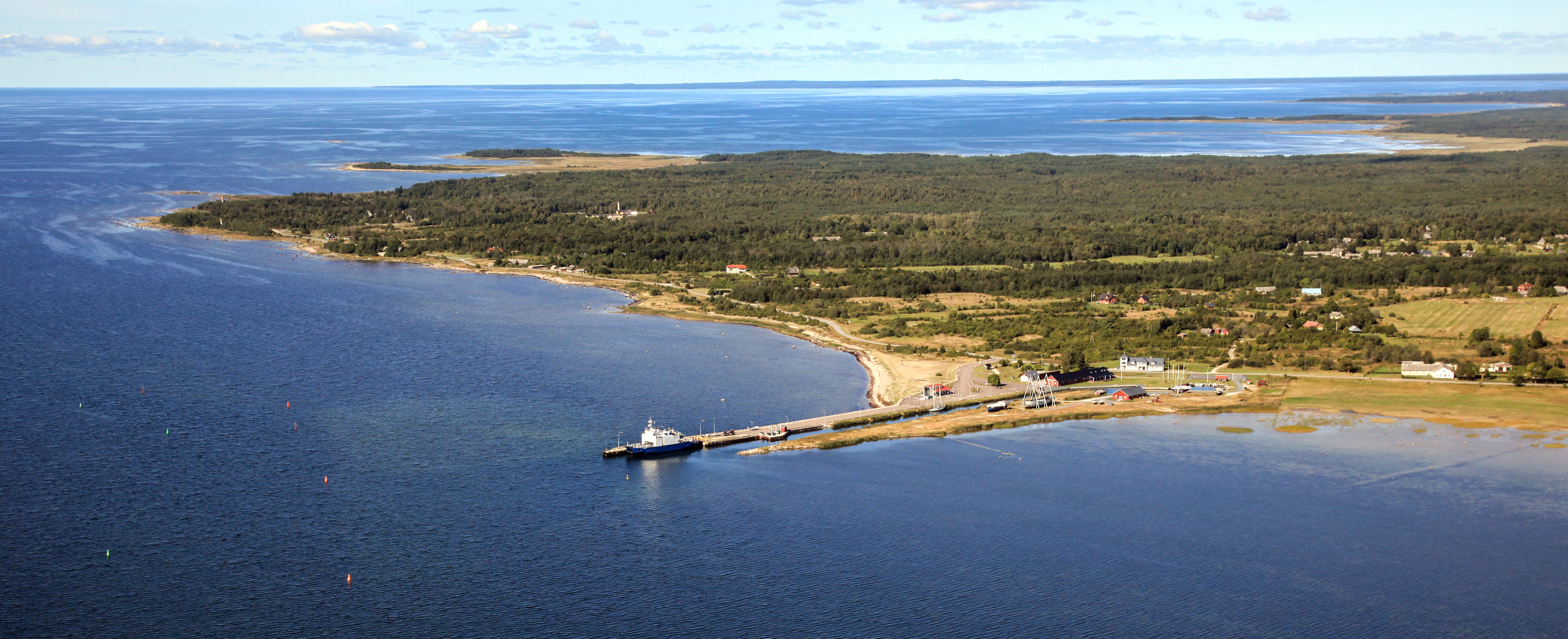
- Sõru harbour

- Location within Estonia
- Coordinates: 58°42′N 22°32′E
- Country: Estonia
- County: Hiiu County
- Parish: Hiiumaa Parish
- Time zone: UTC+2 (EET)
  - Summer (DST): UTC+3 (EEST)

Sõru is a village in Hiiumaa Parish, Hiiu County in northwestern Estonia.

Sõru harbour is located in the neighboring Pärna village. A ferry service operates to Triigi on Saaremaa.
