= Jassy (surname) =

Jassy is a surname. Notable people with the surname include:

- Andy Jassy (born 1968), American businessman, CEO of Amazon
- David Jassy (born 1974), Swedish singer, songwriter, and producer

== See also ==
- Tassy
