= Triigi, Saare County =

Village in Estonia

Coordinates: 58°35′16″N 22°42′20″E

Triigi
- Village
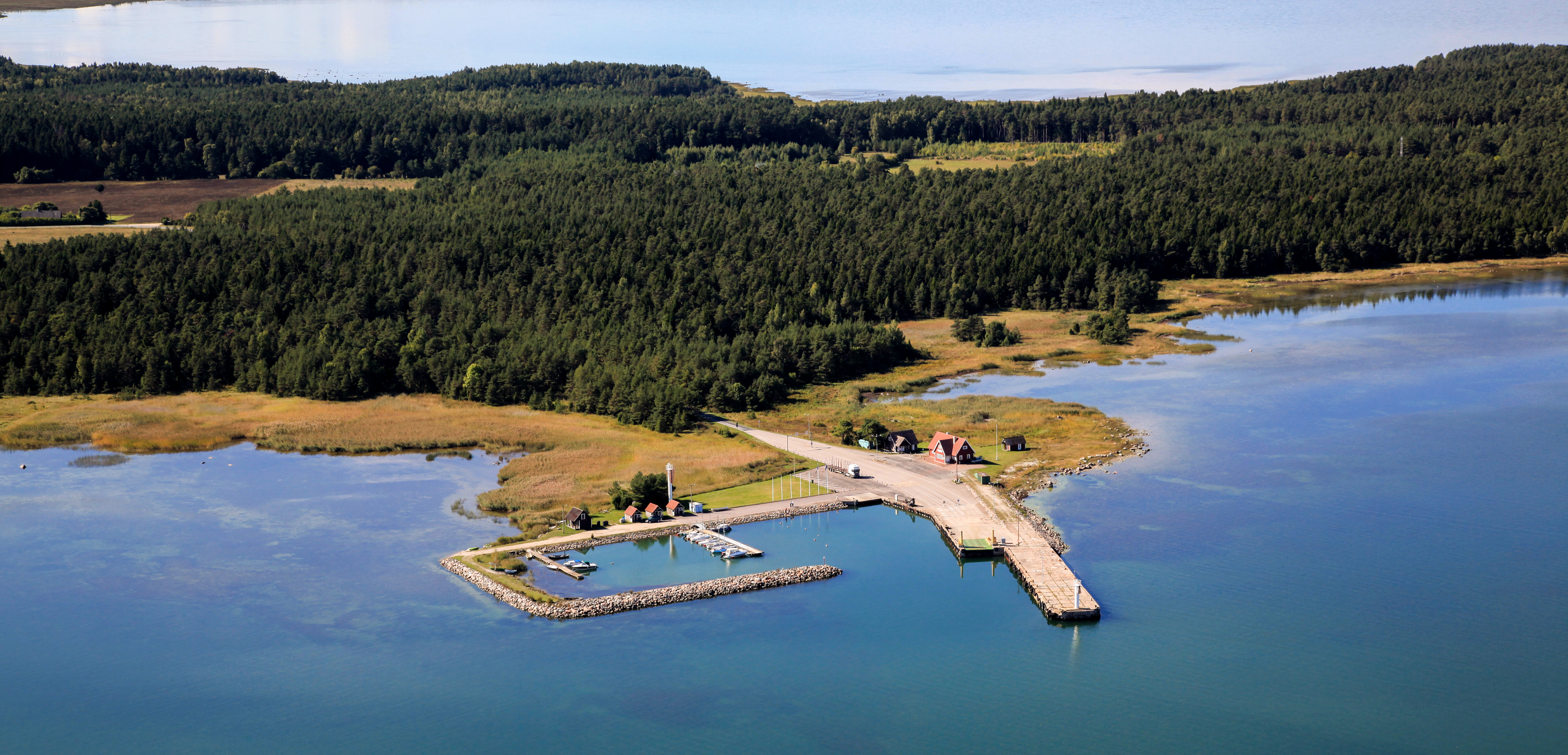
- Triigi harbour
- Interactive map of Triigi
- Country: Estonia
- County: Saare County
- Parish: Saaremaa Parish
- Time zone: UTC+2 (EET)
  - Summer (DST): UTC+3 (EEST)

Triigi is a village in Saaremaa Parish, Saare County in western Estonia.

Before the administrative reform in 2017, the village was in Leisi Parish.

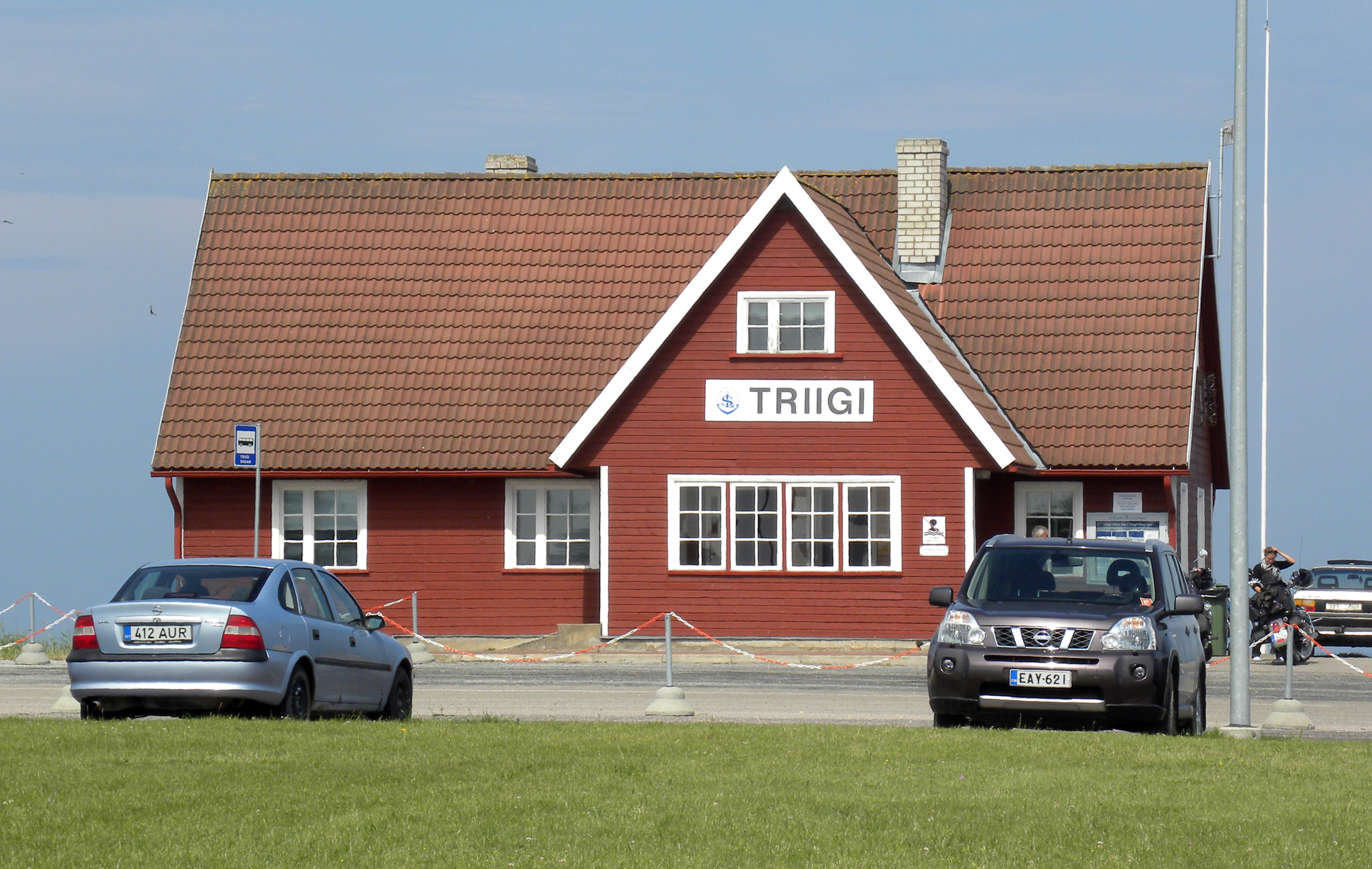
Triigi dock station

A ferry service operates from Triigi harbour to Sõru on the island of Hiiumaa.
