= Kabuna =

Village in Estonia

- Village
- Location within Estonia
- Coordinates: 58°44′N 22°31′E
- Country: Estonia
- County: Hiiu County
- Parish: Hiiumaa Parish
- Time zone: UTC+2 (EET)
  - Summer (DST): UTC+3 (EEST)

Kabuna is a village in Hiiumaa Parish, Hiiu County in northwestern Estonia.

The village was first mentioned in 1798 (Kabbona). Historically, the village was part of Emmaste Manor (German: Emmast).

From 1977 to 1997, Kabuna was part of the village of Külama.
