= Emmaste-Selja =

Village in Estonia

- Village
- Location within Estonia
- Coordinates: 58°46′03″N 22°30′35″E
- Country: Estonia
- County: Hiiu County
- Parish: Hiiumaa Parish
- Time zone: UTC+2 (EET)
  - Summer (DST): UTC+3 (EEST)

Emmaste-Selja (Selja until 2017) is a village in Hiiumaa Parish, Hiiu County in northwestern Estonia.

== Name ==
Emmaste-Selja was named Selja until 2017, when it was renamed Emmaste-Selja, reflecting its origin as part of the territory of Emmaste Manor (German: Emmast) and also distinguishing it from another village named Selja 14 kilometers (8.7 mi) to the northeast.

The village was attested in historical sources as Sellja Pent in 1782 (i.e., 'Pent [Benedict] from Selja', referring to a resident of the village) and as Selja in 1798. The toponym is relatively frequent in Estonia and is derived from the common noun selg (genitive: selja) 'back, crest, ridge (of a hill)'.

== History ==
From 1977 to 1997, Selja was part of the village of Sinima.
