= Lassie (disambiguation) =

Lassie ("girl" in the Scots language, from lass) is a fictional female collie dog character and the stage name of a line of male dogs who have played her.

Lassie may also refer to:

== Works about the dog ==
=== Films ===
- Lassie (1994 film), an American film
- Lassie (2005 film), a British film

=== Television ===
- Lassie (1954 TV series), an American series 1954–1973
- The New Lassie, a syndicated American series 1989–1991
- Lassie (1997 TV series), a Canadian-produced series 1997–1999
- Lassie (2014 TV series), an animated series 2014–2015 and 2020

=== Other media ===
- Lassie (manga), a 2001 Japanese manga series
- Lassie (radio program), an American program 1947–1950

== Other uses ==
- "Lassie", a song by hide from Psyence, 1996
- Carlton Lassiter, nicknamed "Lassie", a fictional character in the TV series Psych
- Lassie Lou Ahern (1920–2018), American actress
- Lassie Goodbread-Black (1904–1996), American farmer and educator
- Lassie, a fictional toy character in the Wee Sing 1988 video: Grandpa's Magical Toys

== See also ==
- Lassy (disambiguation)
- Lassi (disambiguation)
- Lass (disambiguation)
