= Yassy =

Yassy may refer to:

- Iași, a city in north-eastern Romania, former capital of the Principality of Moldavia
- Hazrat-e Turkestan, a town in Kazakhstan
- A right tributary of the Kara Darya in Kyrgyzstan

== See also ==
- Iasi (disambiguation)
- Jassy (disambiguation)
- Yassi (disambiguation)
