= Yassi Mazandi =

Yassi Mazandi, born in Tehran, Iran, lives and works in Los Angeles, California. Mazandi is a sculptor, painter and social activist.

== Personal life and education ==
During 1980-81, they studied at Beechlawn College, Oxford, England, and in 1992-95, they were at Greenwich House Pottery, New York.

== Exhibitions and residencies ==
=== Public collections ===
- Cleveland Museum of Art, Cleveland, Ohio
- Los Angeles County Museum of Art, LACMA, Los Angeles, California
- Roanoke College (Permanent Art Collection), Salem, Virginia
- University of California, Art, Design & Architecture Museum, Santa Barbara, California

=== Solo exhibitions ===
- 2022-2023: Yassi Mazandi: Language of the Birds, Los Angeles County Museum of Art, LACMA, Los Angeles, California
- 2022: Yassi Mazandi: In Flight, Honor Fraser Gallery, Los Angeles, California
- 2018-2019: Yassi Mazandi in Residence, Carolyn Glasoe Bailey Foundation, Ojai, California 2016: Yassi Mazandi: Germs on Sheets, Maloney Fine Art, Los Angeles, California
- 2014: Yassi Mazandi: Sacred Wheel, Maloney Fine Art, Los Angeles, California
- 2009: Architectonic: Yassi Mazandi, JF Chen, Los Angeles, California
- 2007: Yassi Mazandi: Sculpted Ceramics, Allegra Hicks, London, England
- 2007: Yassi Mazandi: Sculpted Vessels, FLUX Gallery, Los Angeles, California
- 2014 Maloney Fine Art, Los Angeles, CA
- 2008 Architectonic, JF Chen, Los Angeles, CA
- 2007 Yassi, Allegra Hicks, London, England
- 2006 Yassi Mazandi, Flux Gallery Los Angeles, CA

=== Residencies ===
- 2021: Artist in Residence, Gazell.io Digital Art House, London, England
- 2018 - 2019: Artist in Residence, Carolyn Glasoe Bailey Foundation, Ojai, California 2018 - 2019:
- Art & Social Practice Resident Artist, ProjectArt, Los Angeles, California 2016:
- Artist in Residence, BoxoPROJECTS, Joshua Tree, California
- 2012: Artist in Residence, Robert Rauschenberg Foundation, Captiva Island, Florida

=== Group exhibitions ===
- 2023-2024 (upcoming): Women Defining Women in Contemporary Art of the Middle East and Beyond, Phoenix Art Museum, Phoenix, Arizona
- 2023 (upcoming): Women Defining Women in Contemporary Art of the Middle East and Beyond, Los Angeles County Museum of Art, Los Angeles, California
- 2022: Symbiosis curated by Beth Rudin DeWoody and produced by Laura Dvorkin, Berkshire Botanical Garden, Stockbridge, Massachusetts
- 2022: Fragile / Fiber, Carolyn Glasoe Bailey Foundation, Ojai, California
- 2022: Totum, Los Angeles Installation, curated by Kyle DeWoody, Los Angeles, California
- 2021: Totum curated by Kyle DeWoody, Black Claro Walnut Farm, Ojai, California
- 2021: The Bunker Artspace,

2021/2022 Season curated by Beth Rudin DeWoody, Laura Dvorkin and Maynard Monrow, West Palm Beach, Florida

- 2021: Pictures at an Exhibition featuring Frost Symphony Orchestra and Gerard Schwarz, co-presented by the Adrienne Arsht Center, Frost School of Music and Lowe Art Museum, Miami, Florida
- 2021: Disassembly Line curated by Pietro Alexander and Sasha Filimonov, co-presented by Molly Barnes and SPY Projects, Molly’s Garage, Beverly Hills, California
- 2021: OpenSea’s First Virtual Gallery Takeover, Gazell.io x OpenSea x Spatial.io, Metaverse
- 2021: Irresistible Delights, University of California, Art, Design & Architecture Museum,

Santa Barbara, California

- 2021: Once Upon a Time, Advocartsy Gallery, Los Angeles, California
- 2021: Art Beyond Survival curated by Damon Martin, Arts District, Los Angeles, California
- 2021: All Tomorrow’s Parties curated by Michael Slenske, domicile (n.), Los Angeles, California
- 2021: Vessel, Telluride Gallery of Fine Art, Telluride, Colorado
- 2021: Ephemeral Tranquility curated by Samantha Meyer, Roanoke College, Salem, Virginia
- 2020: Cave Painting, Painted Cave presented by Carolyn Glasoe Bailey Foundation, Hotel Indigo, Santa Barbara, California
- 2020: 2 Day, LSH CoLab, Los Angeles, California
- 2019: Fierce Generosity 2.0, Burnet Fine Art, Minneapolis, Minnesota
- 2019: ProjectArt Artist Exhibition, Redling Fine Art at Tin Flats, Los Angeles, California
- 2019: Bombay Beach Biennale, Bombay Beach, California
- 2019: SPRING/BREAK Art Show (by invitation), The Stalls at Skylight ROW DLTA, Los Angeles, California
- 2018-2019: Surreal By Nature presented by Carolyn Glasoe Bailey Foundation, Hotel Indigo, Santa Barbara, California
- 2018: The Other Art Fair presented by Saatchi Art (by invitation), Santa Monica, California
- 2018: My Kid Could Do That, The Underground Museum, Los Angeles, California
- 2018: Bombay Beach Biennale, Bombay Beach, California
- 2017: Legacy: Highlights from the Roanoke College Permanent Collection, Olin Gallery, Salem, Virginia
- 2017: All The Small Things, Steve Turner Contemporary, Los Angeles, California
- 2017: “Wouldn’t it be nice if we could dream together?”, Diane Rosenstein Gallery, Los Angeles, California
- 2017: Converge 45 curated by Kristy Edmunds, Hoffman Gallery (OCAC), Portland, Oregon
- 2017: Bombay Beach Biennale, Bombay Beach, California
- 2017: Material Art Fair - Mexico City, Grice Bench Gallery, Los Angeles, California
- 2016: All-In, Club Pro Gallery, Los Angeles, California
- 2016: Intersectionality curated by Richard Haden, Museum of Contemporary Art, North Miami, Florida
- 2014: Art is Hope curated by René-Julien Praz, PIASA, Paris, France
- 2014: Intangible Beauty: Beautiful Women and the Endless Void, Kasher|Potamkin Gallery, New York, New York
- 2013 Angel Art Auction, Los Angeles, CA
- 2012 Of White, Nuartlink Contemporary, Westport, CT
- 2011 Superba, JF Chen, Los Angeles, CA
- 2011 The January White Sale, Loretta Howard Gallery, New York, NY
- 2010 SHIFT, Los Angeles, CA
- 2001 The Mixed Show, Red Barn, South Hampton, NY
- 1996 Japan American Ceramics, Japanese Society, New York, NY

=== Residencies ===
- 2012 Rauschenberg Residency, Captiva Island, FL
