= Emmaste-Kurisu =

Village in Estonia

- Village
- Location within Estonia
- Coordinates: 58°46′10″N 22°32′34″E
- Country: Estonia
- County: Hiiu County
- Parish: Hiiumaa Parish
- Time zone: UTC+2 (EET)
  - Summer (DST): UTC+3 (EEST)

Emmaste-Kurisu (until 2017 Kurisu) is a village in Hiiumaa Parish, Hiiu County in northwestern Estonia.

== Name ==
Emmaste-Kurisu was named Kurisu until 2017, when it was renamed Emmaste-Kurisu, reflecting its origin as part of the territory of Emmaste Manor (German: Emmast) and also distinguishing it from another village named Kurisu 21 kilometers (13 mi) to the north.

The village was attested in historical sources as Kuris Andres in 1609 (referring to a resident of the village) and as Kurriso in 1798. The linguist Paul Ariste and the onomastician Leo Tiik identify the common noun kurisu 'karst sinkhole' as the origin of the village name. There is a large karst sinkhole on the southwest edge of the village called the Kurisoo Hole (Estonian: Kurisoo auk).

== History ==
From 1977 to 1997, Kurisu was part of the village of Lassi.
