= Tassy =

Tassy is a French surname. Notable people with this surname include:

- Antoine Tassy (1924–1991), Haitian football player and manager
- Fernande Tassy (1903–1952), French fencer
- Jean Tassy, Haitian football player and manager
- Joseph Héliodore Garcin de Tassy (1794–1878), French orientalist
- Marcel Tassy (1932–2024), French politician

== See also ==
- Tassy Johnson (1916–1981), Australian cyclist
