= Emmaste =

Village in Estonia

- Village
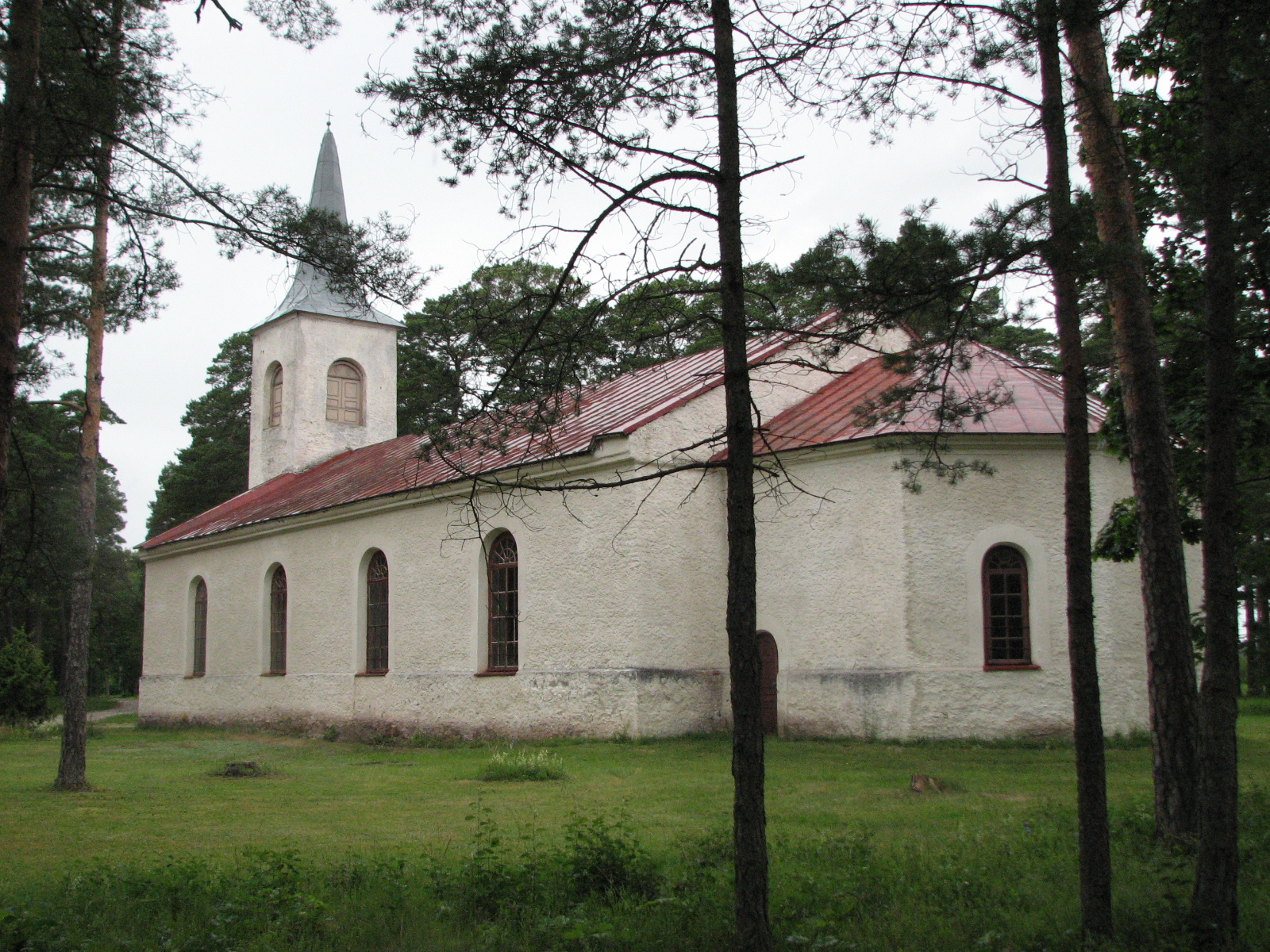
- The church in Emmaste.

- Location within Estonia
- Coordinates: 58°42′N 22°37′E
- Country: Estonia
- County: Hiiu County
- Parish: Hiiumaa Parish
- Time zone: UTC+2 (EET)
  - Summer (DST): UTC+3 (EEST)

Emmaste (German: Emmast) is a village in Hiiumaa Parish, Hiiu County in northwestern Estonia.

Emmaste received village status in 1977. Prior to that it was a small rural settlement (Estonian: asundus) formed in the 1920s from the territory of Emmaste Manor (German: Emmast). The eastern part of the village was known as Nõmme. In the 1920s and 1930s, Nõmme had the status of a separate village. In 1977, the nearby village of Viiterna was merged with Emmaste.
