= Lasi =

Lasi or LASI may refer to:

- Lasi people, an ethnic group of Pakistan
- Lasi language, an Indo-Aryan language of Pakistan
- Lasi (letter), a letter of the Georgian alphabet
- LasI, or Acyl-homoserine-lactone synthase, an enzyme
- Johann Lasi, a World War I pilot

== See also ==
- Laasi, a village in Estonia
- Lassi (disambiguation)
- Lasy in Poland
- Iasi (disambiguation)
