= Iasi (disambiguation) =

Iași (historically referred to as Jassy, Yassy, Yassi, Iassy, or Iassi) is a city in Moldavia, northeastern Romania.

Iași may also refer to:

== Places in Romania ==
- Iași County
- Iași, a village in Recea Commune, Brașov County
- Iași-Gorj, a village in Drăguțești Commune, Gorj County
- Iașu, a village in Ulieș Commune, Harghita County

== Historic geography ==
- Municipium Iasorum, an autonomous territory in ancient Roman Pannonia (in present-day Croatia)

== Other uses ==
- Jasz people, an ethnic group in Hungary, of Ossetic origin
- IASI, the Infrared atmospheric sounding interferometer
- Iași Open, a professional tennis tournament

== See also ==
- Jassy (disambiguation)
- Yasi (disambiguation)
- Lasi (disambiguation)
