= Pärna =

Village in Estonia

- Village
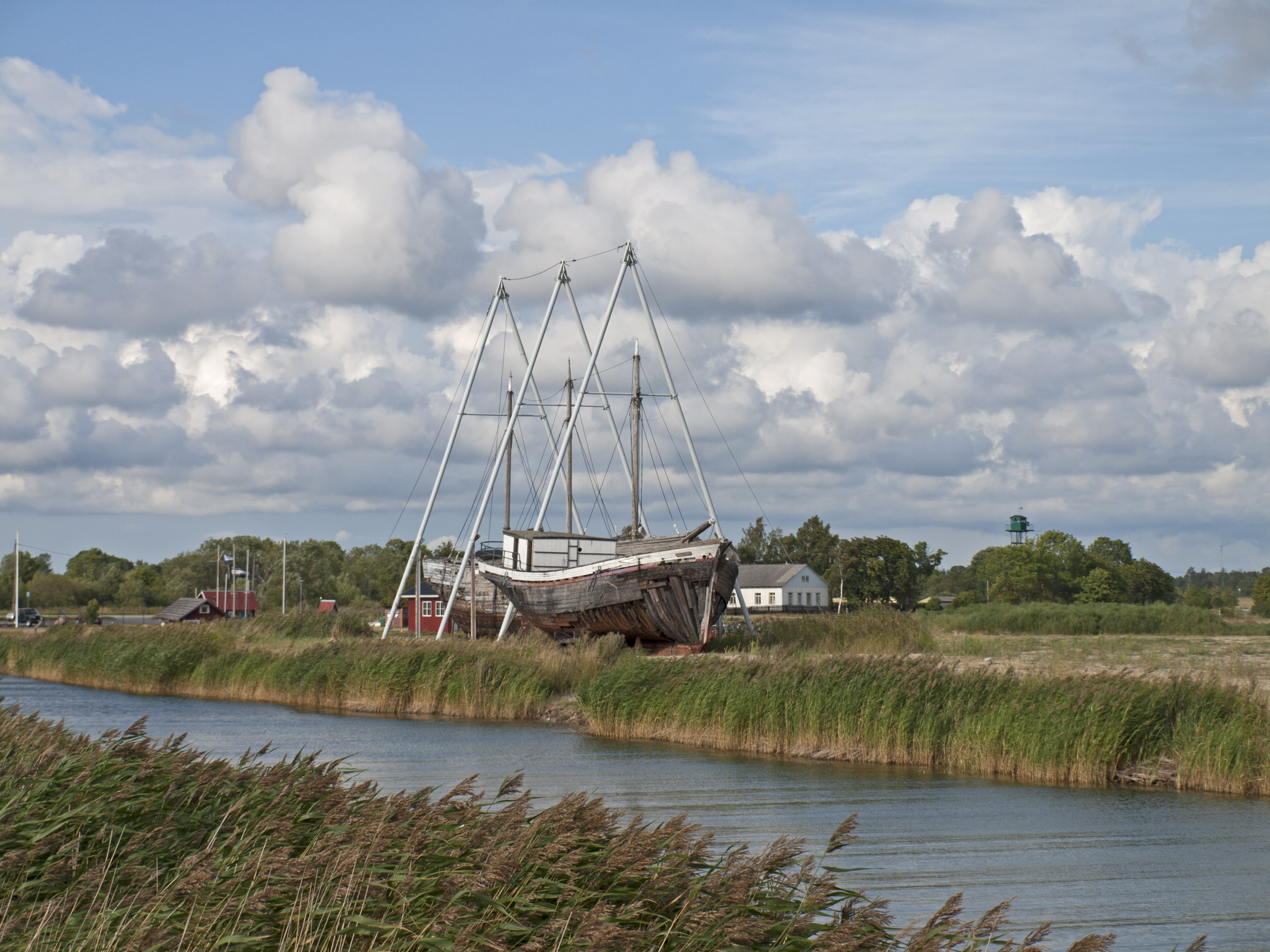
- Pärna from the port of Sõru

- Location within Estonia
- Coordinates: 58°42′04″N 22°31′40″E
- Country: Estonia
- County: Hiiu County
- Parish: Hiiumaa Parish
- Time zone: UTC+2 (EET)
  - Summer (DST): UTC+3 (EEST)

Pärna is a village in Hiiumaa Parish, Hiiu County in northwestern Estonia.

Sõru harbour is located there.

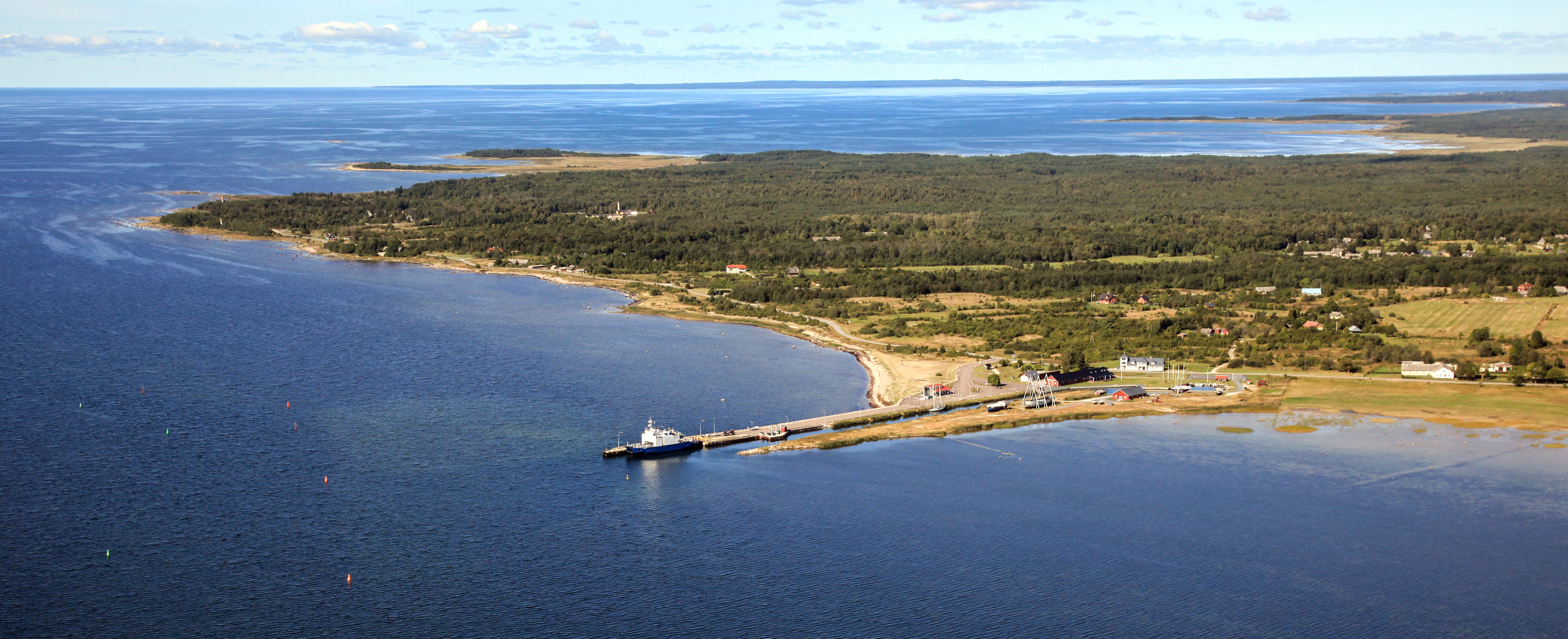
Sõru harbour in Pärna village

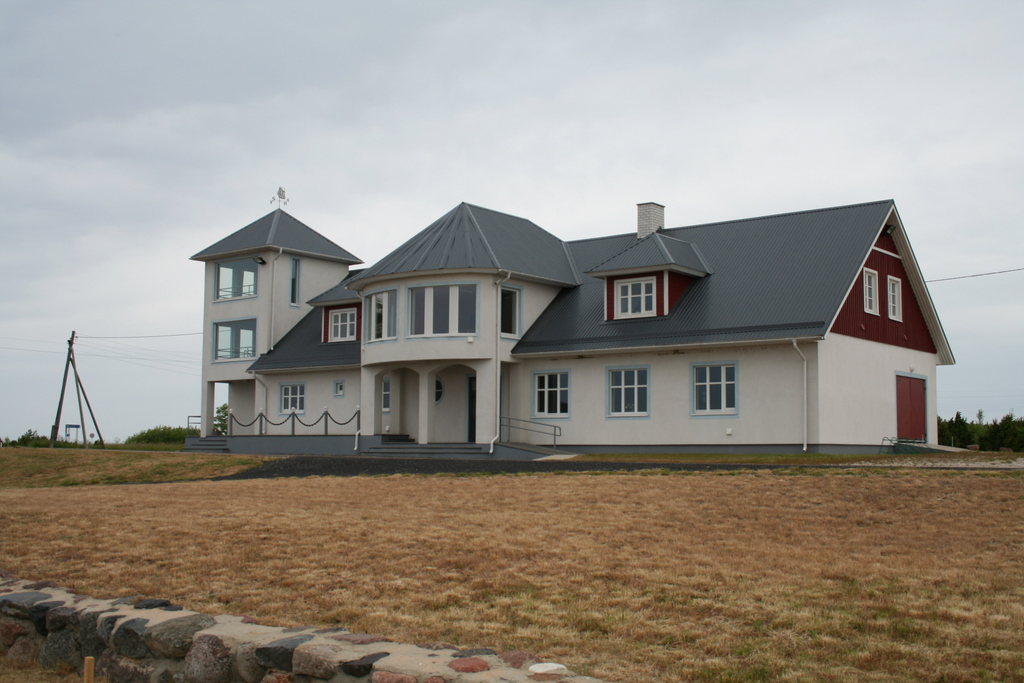
Sõru museum next to harbour
