= Kaderna =

Village in Estonia

- Village
- Location within Estonia
- Coordinates: 58°48′N 22°29′E
- Country: Estonia
- County: Hiiu County
- Parish: Hiiumaa Parish

Population (2011)
  - Total: 2
- Time zone: UTC+2 (EET)
  - Summer (DST): UTC+3 (EEST)

Kaderna is a village in Hiiumaa Parish, Hiiu County in northwestern Estonia.

The village was first mentioned in 1913 (Кадерна). Historically, the village was part of Emmaste Manor (German: Emmast).
