= Lassi, Hiiu County =

Village in Estonia

Lassi
- Village
- Location in Estonia
- Coordinates: 58°46′26″N 22°31′38″E
- Country: Estonia
- County: Hiiu County
- Municipality: Hiiumaa Parish

Population (01.01.2000)
  - Total: 44

Lassi is a village in Hiiumaa Parish, Hiiu County, Estonia, located on the southern part of Hiiumaa island. It has a population of 44 (as of 1 January 2000).
