= Reigi =

Village in Estonia

- Village
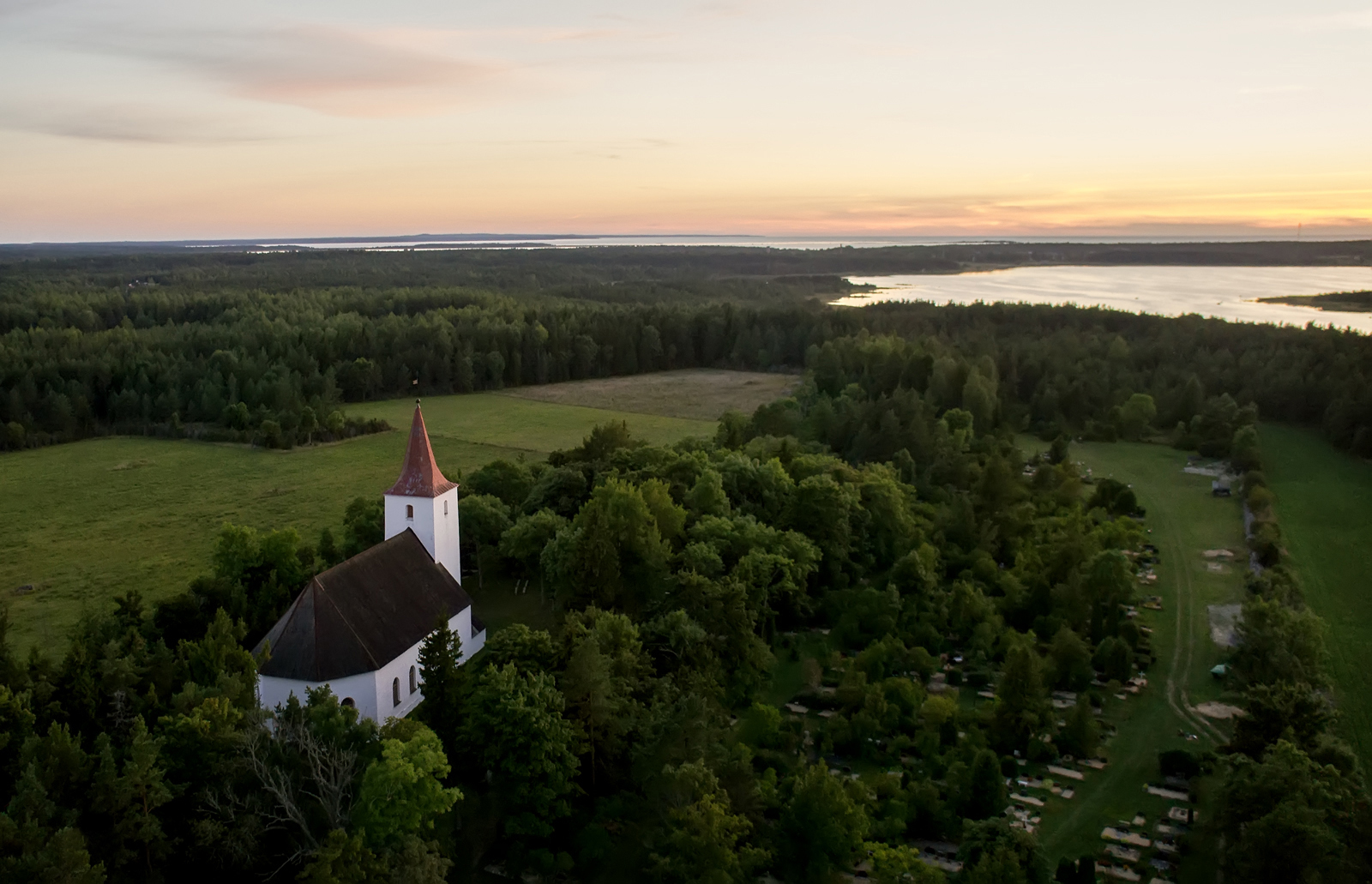
- Church in Reigi

- Location within Estonia
- Coordinates: 59°00′N 22°32′E
- Country: Estonia
- County: Hiiu County
- Parish: Hiiumaa Parish
- Time zone: UTC+2 (EET)
  - Summer (DST): UTC+3 (EEST)

Reigi (German: Roicks) is a village in Hiiumaa Parish, Hiiu County in northwestern Estonia. Before 2013, it was located in Kõrgessaare Parish.

== History ==
In 1984, the Estonian writer Herman Sergo published the novel Näkimadalad, whose title is based on the name of the Nekmangrund shoal. In his three-volume work, Sergo portrays the tragic fate of the Estonian Swedes living in the village of Reigi, located south of the shoal on Hiiumaa Island, who were deported in the 18th century to southern Ukraine following a Russian Imperial decree.

== People ==
- Carl Ludvig Lithander (1773–1843), classical composer and military officer, born in Reigi

== See also ==
- Reigilaid
- Hiiu Shoal
