= List of shipwrecks in July 1874 =

The list of shipwrecks in July 1874 includes ships sunk, foundered, grounded, or otherwise lost during July 1874.

== 4 July ==
List of shipwrecks: 4 July 1874
Ship	State	Description
Eugenie	United Kingdom	The yacht ran aground on the Brake Sand and was wrecked.
Mary Ann	United Kingdom	The ship foundered in the Irish Sea with the loss of all hands, according to a message in a bottle that washed up at Lytham St. Annes, Lancashire in August.

== 5 July ==
List of shipwrecks: 5 July 1874
Ship	State	Description
Ann Potts	United Kingdom	The brig was run into by the steamship Gothland (United Kingdom) and sank off the Lofoten Islands, Norway with the loss of five of her nine crew. Survivors were rescued by Gothland. Ann Potts was on a voyage from Bergen, Norway to Onega, Russia.
Czar	United Kingdom	The ship was driven ashore at Sillery, Quebec, Canada. She was on a voyage from Quebec City to Greenock, Renfrewshire. She was refloated on 21 August and taken in to Quebec City for repairs.
Pomona	United Kingdom	The ship foundered off Nidingen, Sweden. Her crew were rescued. She was on a voyage from South Shields, County Durham to Kronstadt, Russia.
Sancho	United Kingdom	The brig ran aground on the Milleplatte, in the North Sea off the German coast. She was on a voyage from Rotterdam, South Holland, Netherlands to Geestemünde, Germany. She was refloated and towed in to Geestemünde in a leaky condition.

== 6 July ==
List of shipwrecks: 6 July 1874
Ship	State	Description
Highlander	United Kingdom	The barque was driven ashore and wrecked on Cape Sable Island, Nova Scotia, Canada. She was on a voyage from Sunderland, County Durham to Saint John, New Brunswick, Canada.
Sancho	Germany	The ship ran aground on the Mittelplatte, in the Baltic Sea. She was refloated the next day and towed in to Geestemünde in a leaky condition.

== 7 July ==
List of shipwrecks: 7 July 1874
Ship	State	Description
Canton	United Kingdom	The steamship was wrecked on the Min Reef, in the Min River. She was on a voyage from Fuzhou, China to London.
Hipparchus	Brazil	The steamship ran aground at Ryde, Isle of Wight. She was on a voyage from the River Plate to Southampton, Hampshire, United Kingdom and Bremen, Germany. She was refloated with the assistance of a number of tugs and resumed her voyage.
Rio Douro	Portugal	The steamship was wrecked at Esposende. Her crew were rescued. She was on a voyage from Lisbon to Havre de Grâce, Seine-Inférieure.
Robin Hood	United Kingdom	The tug was holed by an anchor, developed a severe leak, and sank at Cowes, Isle of Wight. She was refloated on 10 July and taken in to Portsmouth, Hampshire.
Tenasserim	United Kingdom	The steamship was wrecked near Hafun, Majeerteen Sultanate. All on board were rescued. She was on a voyage from Rangoon, Burma to Glasgow, Renfrewshire.
Victorine	France	The schooner was wrecked at Ringkøbing, Denmark. She was on a voyage from Rouen, Seine-Inférieure to Saint Petersburg, Russia.

== 8 July ==
List of shipwrecks: 8 July 1874
Ship	State	Description
Arche d'Alliance	France	The fishing lugger sprang a leak and foundered in the North Sea. Her crew were rescued by a lugger.

== 9 July ==
List of shipwrecks: 9 July 1874
Ship	State	Description
Elysia	United Kingdom	The steamship ran aground in the Clyde at Port Glasgow, Renfrewshire.

== 10 July ==
List of shipwrecks: 10 July 1874
Ship	State	Description
George H. Peake	Western Australia	The brig collided with the barque Sierra Nevada United States) and sank off Newcastle, New South Wales. Her crew were rescued.
James Stevenson	United Kingdom	The ship ran aground in the River Thames.
Killiney	United Kingdom	The steamship collided with the steamship Whampoa (United Kingdom) and sank off the Middle Mouse Sand, in Liverpool Bay. Her crew were rescued. Killiney was on a voyage from Liverpool, Lancashire to Dublin.

== 11 July ==
List of shipwrecks: 11 July 1874
Ship	State	Description
Ellen Constance	United Kingdom	The steamship was driven ashore on the south point of Öland, Sweden. She was on a voyage from Riga, Russia to Grimsby, Lincolnshire. She was refloated but found to be leaky and was beached. Ellen Constance was refloated on 14 July with the assistance of a steamship.
Gananoque	United Kingdom	The ship struck an iceberg and sank off Cape Race, Newfoundland Colony with the loss of a crew member. She was on a voyage from Halifax, Nova Scotia, Canada to Greenock, Renfrewshire.
Glenarvon	United Kingdom	The steamship was driven ashore on Öland. She was refloated the next day.
Jumelles	France	The fishing lugger sprang a leak and foundered in the North Sea 15 nautical miles (28 km) off Craster, Caithness, United Kingdom. Her crew survived.
Killeney	United Kingdom	The steamship collided with the steamship Whampoa (United Kingdom) and sank off Liverpool, Lancashire. Her crew were rescued.
Royal Family	United Kingdom	The ship was wrecked at Cape Guardafui, Majeerteen Sultanate. Her crew were rescued by the steamship Glenearn (United Kingdom). Royal Family was on a voyage from Cardiff, Glamorgan to Aden.
Unnamed	Flag unknown	The schooner was driven ashore on Öland. She was refloated.

== 13 July ==
List of shipwrecks: 13 July 1874
Ship	State	Description
Annabelle	United Kingdom	The barque ran aground in the Min River. She was on a voyage from Amoy to Fuzhou, China. She had been refloated by 16 July and taken in to Fuzhou.
Eastern Star	United Kingdom	The ship departed from Troon, Ayrshire for Singapore, Straits Settlements. No further trace, presumed foundered with the loss of all hands.
Paterson	New Zealand	The 290-ton steamer grounded at the entrance to the Waitara River, New Zealand. Much of her cargo was salvaged before she was shifted off the spit on which she was resting, rolling out into the river broadside to the tide. She eventually broke up during a storm in early August.

== 14 July ==
List of shipwrecks: 14 July 1874
Ship	State	Description
Charles Eugenie	France	The barque ran aground and sank in the Isles of Scilly, United Kingdom. Her crew were rescued.
Victory	United Kingdom	The ship was driven ashore on Anticosti Island, Nova Scotia, Canada. She was on a voyage from Liverpool, Lancashire to Quebec City, Canada. She was later refloated, completing her voyage on 23 July.

== 16 July ==
List of shipwrecks: 16 July 1874
Ship	State	Description
Annie Bow	United Kingdom	The schooner was driven ashore near Beachy Head, Sussex.
Exampler	United Kingdom	The brigantine was wrecked off the mouth of the Nun River, Africa with the loss of three of her crew. Her captain survived. She was on a voyage from Liverpool, Lancashire to Africa.
Glasgow	United Kingdom	The brig was wrecked. Her captain was rescued.
Spring	United Kingdom	The ship ran aground and sank in the Svenska Högarna, Sweden. Her crew survived.

== 17 July ==
List of shipwrecks: 17 July 1874
Ship	State	Description
Bengal	United Kingdom	The steamship ran aground at Yokohama, Japan. She was on a voyage from Shanghai, China to Yokohama.

== 18 July ==
List of shipwrecks: 18 July 1874
Ship	State	Description
Santos	Germany	The schooner was driven ashore and wrecked.

== 19 July ==
List of shipwrecks: 19 July 1874
Ship	State	Description
Don Pelayo	Spain	The steamship was wrecked and sank at Cape Vilano, Spain. All on board were rescued, three of them by the steamship Ana (Spain). Don Pelayo was on a voyage from Cádiz to Santander.
Thornaby	United Kingdom	The steamship ran aground on the Englishman's Shoal, in the Bosphorus. She was refloated on 24 July.
Warrior Queen	United Kingdom	The ship was driven ashore at San Francisco, California, United States and was abandoned by her crew. She was on a voyage from Otago, New Zealand to San Francisco.

== 20 July ==
List of shipwrecks: 20 July 1874
Ship	State	Description
Roseden	United Kingdom	The steamship was run into by the steamship Onega (United Kingdom) and sank 15 nautical miles (28 km) west of Hanstholm, Denmark. Her crew were rescued by Onega. Roseden was on a voyage from South Shields, County Durham to Kronstadt, Russia.

== 21 July ==
List of shipwrecks: 21 July 1874
Ship	State	Description
Bertha	Germany	The ship was driven ashore on "Luppe Island", in the Gulf of Finland. She was on a voyage from Kronstadt, Russia to the Weser.
Eliezer	Norway	The ship ran aground on Neckmansgrund and was wrecked. She was on a voyage from Hull, Yorkshire, United Kingdom to Vyborg, Grand Duchy of Finland.
Racedon	United Kingdom	The steamship collided with the steamship Onega (United Kingdom) and sank at Fredrikshavn, Denmark. Her crew were rescued. Racedon was on a voyage from the River Tyne to Kronstadt.
Stanley	United Kingdom	The ship was driven ashore at Filey Brig, Yorkshire. She was on a voyage from Sunderland, County Durham to Penang, Straits Settlements. She was refloated and towed in to South Shields, County Durham in a leaky condition by the steamship Jubilee (United Kingdom).
Vildosala	Flag unknown	The steamship ran aground on the Holm Sand. She was refloated and resumed her voyage.
William Thurlbeck	United Kingdom	The ship ran aground on the Dalgaya Bank.

== 22 July ==
List of shipwrecks: 22 July 1874
Ship	State	Description
Emerald Isle	United Kingdom	The schooner was driven ashore at "Gorten", Argyllshire. She was refloated the next day with the assistance of a steamship.

== 23 July ==
List of shipwrecks: 23 July 1874
Ship	State	Description
Mary	United Kingdom	The sloop was run down and sunk off St Anne's Head, Pembrokeshire with the loss of all hands.

== 24 July ==
List of shipwrecks: 24 July 1874
Ship	State	Description
Blair Athol	United Kingdom	The ship was wrecked on the English Bank, in the River Plate. She was on a voyage from Bordeaux, Gironde, France to Montevideo, Uruguay.
Minister Roon	United Kingdom	The steamship ran aground in Southampton Water. She was on a voyage from Baltimore, Maryland, United States to Southampton, Hampshire. She was refloated and taken in to Southampton.
Ville de Malaga	France	The steamship was driven ashore on Skagen, Denmark. She was on a voyage from Havre de Grâce, Seine-Inférieure to Kronstadt, Russia. She was refloated and taken in to Copenhagen, Denmark.

== 25 July ==
List of shipwrecks: 25 July 1874
Ship	State	Description
Eaglet	(United Kingdom of Great Britain and Ireland) Cape Colony	The ship was wrecked in Plettenberg Bay. Her crew were rescued.
Fingoe	United Kingdom	The ship was wrecked at East London, Cape Colony. Her crew were rescued. She was on a voyage from London to East London.
Letitia	Germany	The schooner was wrecked at the mouth of the Kowie River. Her crew were rescued. She was on a voyage from London to the Kowie River.
Lucy Wicks	United Kingdom	The barque ran aground off Ensenada, Argentina. She was on a voyage from London to Buenos Aires, Argentina.
Nancy	United Kingdom	The smack was driven ashore and wrecked in Pollock Bay.
Natal Star	United Kingdom	The barque was wrecked at East London. Her crew were rescued. She was on a voyage from Cape Town, Cape Colony to East London.
Supreme	United Kingdom	The barque crashed into the coast near Oslo, Norway. She was on her maiden voyage from Southampton to Oslo. All of the crew members were rescued by local fishermen.
Santos	(United Kingdom of Great Britain and Ireland) Cape Colony	The ship was wrecked in Mossel Bay.

== 26 July ==
List of shipwrecks: 26 July 1874
Ship	State	Description
Alsatia	Germany	The steamship ran aground and was wrecked at Puerto Plata, Dominican Republic. She was on a voyage from Southampton, Hampshire, United Kingdom to the West Indies.

== 27 July ==
List of shipwrecks: 27 July 1874
Ship	State	Description
Albion	United Kingdom	The schooner ran aground at Hartlepool, County Durham. She was on a voyage from Great Yarmouth, Norfolk to Hartlepool. She was refloated.
Brûne	France	The schooner ran aground and sank at Cardiff, Glamorgan, United Kingdom of Great Britain and Ireland. Her crew survived. She was on a voyage from Santander, Spain to Newport, Monmouthshire, United Kingdom.
Millbank	United Kingdom	The steamship collided with the steamship Hankow (United Kingdom) and sank in the English Channel 5 nautical miles (9.3 km) off Dungeness, Kent with the loss of fourteen of the 30 people on board. Survivors were rescued by Hankow. Millbank was on a voyage from Cartagena, Spain to Sunderland, County Durham.

== 28 July ==
List of shipwrecks: 28 July 1874
Ship	State	Description
Camille Henri	France	The ship was wrecked on the coast of Iceland. Her crew were rescued.
Gordon Castle	United Kingdom	The steamship ran aground near Lisbon, Portugal. All on board were rescued. She was on a voyage from Hankou, China to London. Gordon Castle was refloated on 13 August and was towed in to Lisbon the next day.

== 29 July ==
List of shipwrecks: 29 July 1874
Ship	State	Description
Tethys	United Kingdom	The ship departed from Sydney, New South Wales for San Francisco, California, United States. No further trace, presumed foundered with the loss of all hands.

== 30 July ==
List of shipwrecks: 30 July 1874
Ship	State	Description
Carl	Germany	The 167-ton brig struck a rock at the entrance to Bluff Harbour, New Zealand, ripping away much of her keel. The crew survived, but much of her cargo was lost.
Independencia	Brazil	The ironclad was severely damaged at Cubitt Town, Essex during an attempt to launch her. She was launched on 10 September, repaired and sold the Royal Navy, entering service as HMS Neptune.

== 31 July ==
List of shipwrecks: 31 July 1874
Ship	State	Description
Jean	United Kingdom	The sloop was severely damaged by fire at Maryport, Cumberland.
Onda	United Kingdom	The ship ran aground at Carnlough, County Antrim. She was on a voyage from Carnlough to Granton, Lothian. She was refloated and resumed her voyage in a leaky condition, but consequently sank off Larne, County Antrim.

== Unknown date ==
List of shipwrecks: Unknown date in July 1874
Ship	State	Description
Annie Laurie	United Kingdom	The schooner was wrecked near Halifax, Nova Scotia, Canada before 21 July. Her crew were rescued. She was on a voyage from Saint John, New Brunswick, Canada to a British port.
Aurora	United Kingdom	The ship was driven ashore and wrecked at Bahia, Brazil.
City of Guatemala	United States	The ship was wrecked on Watling's Island, Bahamas. She was on a voyage from New York to Colón, United States of Colombia.
Cormorant	Flag unknown	The brig ran aground on the Saloo Reef.
Flying Cloud	United Kingdom	The ship ran aground at Navy Island, Ontario, Canada. She was refloated and taken in to Saint John's, Newfoundland Colony.
Matilda Hilyard	United Kingdom	The ship was wrecked on the Manicougan Shoals, in the Saint Lawrence River. She was on a voyage from Montreal, Quebec to Queenstown, County Cork.
Olyphant	United Kingdom	The steamship was wrecked at Keelung, Formosa.
Silver Cloud	United Kingdom	The ship was abandoned. Her crew were rescued. She was on a voyage from Portland, Dorset to Queenstown.
Tyrian	United Kingdom	The steamship ran aground on Cape Sable Island. Her passengers were taken off. She was on a voyage from Liverpool, Lancashire to Halifax. She was refloated, her passengers were reboarded and she completed her voyage, arriving at Halifax on 21 July.
Wyburton	United Kingdom	The steamship collided with a Spanish steamship south of Suez, Egypt and was wrecked. Her crew were rescued.
Unnamed	Russia	The barque sank in Lake Onega off Vitegra before 24 July.
