= St. Nikolai, Greifswald =

Coordinates: 54°05′44″N 13°22′39″E

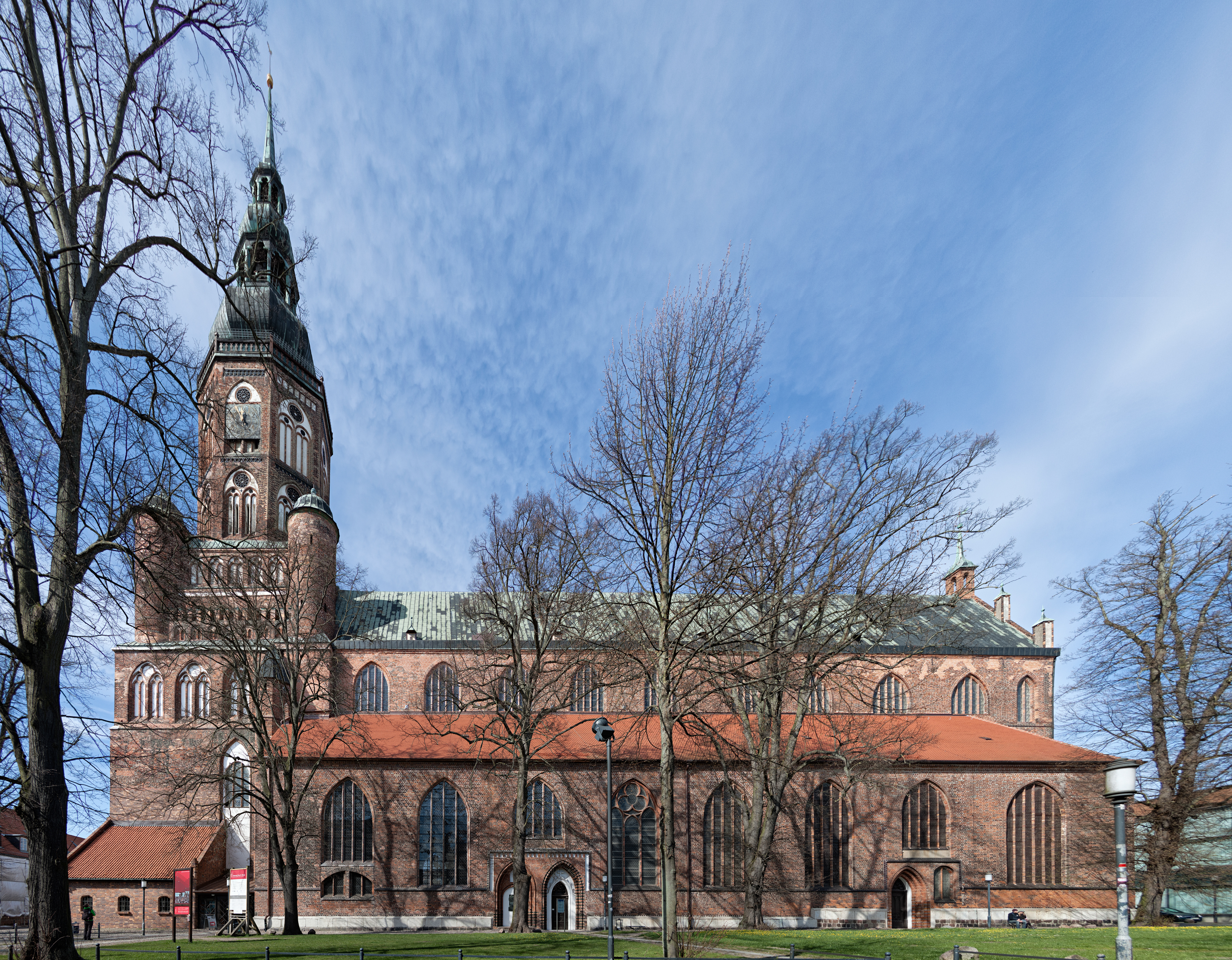
View of the exterior

St. Nikolai, Greifswald (German: Greifswalder Dom St. Nikolai), dedicated to Saint Nicholas, the patron saint of seafarers and merchants, is a Brick Gothic church located in the western part of the centre of Greifswald. It was the main church and seat of the bishop of the Pomeranian Evangelical Church.

== History ==
The first written sources referring to a church dedicated to St. Nicholas in Greifswald are from 1263. The oldest extant parts of the church have been dated to the last third of the 13th century. The building of the church started with the erection of a single-nave choir, which was later incorporated in a hall church with two aisles and a nave of equal size. The foundations of the western tower were laid at the same time. The church was furnished with its first organ already in 1362. In 1385 work was begun on a new choir with a straight eastern wall, which was finished in 1395.

=== Collegiate church, 1457 ===
In connection to the founding of the University of Greifswald, the church was raised to the status of collegiate church by the Bishop of Cammin Henning Iven. The new status of the church also brought wealth, and in the same year construction began to make the tower higher. In the years 1480–1500, the octagonal upper part of the tower was built and with the addition of the also octagonal, c. 60 metres (200 ft) high Gothic spire at the beginning of the 16th century, the construction of the tower was finished. At the time, it reached a height of 120 metres (390 ft).

=== Collapse of the tower, 1650 ===
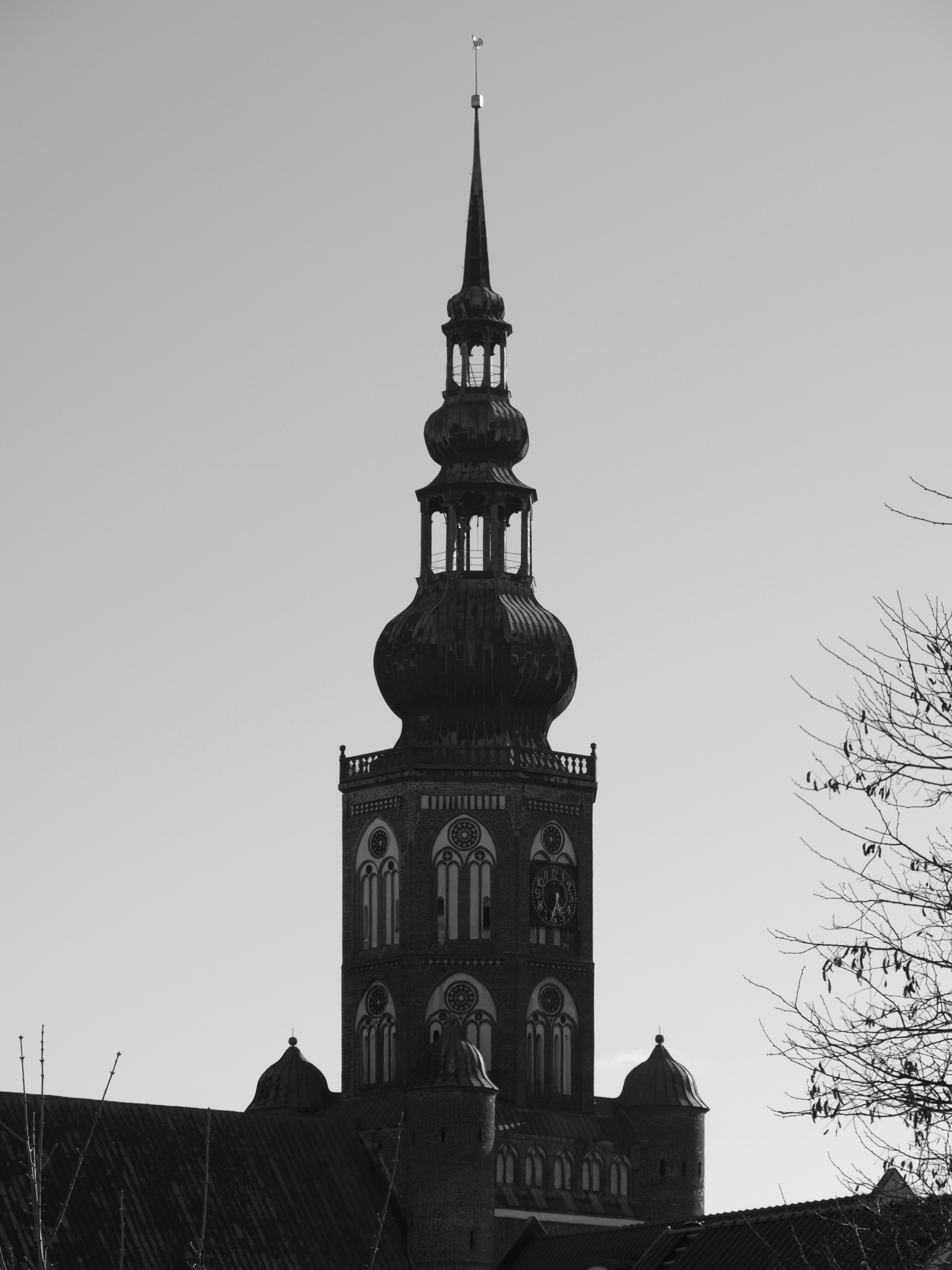
Silhouette of the tower

The church lost its spire twice during severe storms. The first time was in 1515, when the top collapsed, apparently without causing any severe damage to the church building. It was not replaced until 1609. The collapse on 13 February 1650 initially destroyed the roof of the church, causing several of the vaults of the nave and southern aisle to collapse, and a few days later, the eastern wall of the church also collapsed. The interior furnishings of the church were completely destroyed. Immediately after the collapse, the council of the city called for donations for the reconstruction of the church. The citizens of Greifswald together with those of the neighbouring towns Stralsund and Anklam, as well as the ruler of Swedish Pomerania, Queen Christina, donated so much money and building material in a short time that reconstruction of the church could start only a month after the accident, under the leadership of masons from Stralsund. In 1651 the vaults and roof were rebuilt, and one year later the church tower received its new, Baroque spire, modeled on that of St. Mary's in Stralsund as well as Baroque towers in the Netherlands — consisting of a lantern and cupola — which are substantially more stable than the slim, Gothic spires. The spire has since remained unchanged. In 1653 the eastern wall was also restored.

=== 19th century ===
The interior of the church was thoroughly renewed in 1823–1832. The refurnishing was carried out to the designs by the Greifswald architect Gottlieb Giese. Giese had the entire interior of the church whitewashed and covered with a coating of sandstone-coloured paint. The choir was heightened and behind the altar a choir wall was erected, richly adorned with filigree decorations. All furnishings were also replaced. Composer Carl Ludvig Lithander was organist of the church 1824–1839.

=== East Germany ===
After World War II, the church was made a bishops' seat for the Pomeranian Evangelical Church. Both the exterior and interior of the church however remained unchanged in shape it had since the renovation during the 19th century. Only after the amelioration of the relationship between the church and the regime in the 1970s could a major renovation of the church be begun. Responsible for the plans was the Hamburg-based architect Friedhelm Grundmann. The dwindling number of churchgoers called for a refurnishing of the church, with a second altar erected in the middle of the church. North of the new altar a baptismal chapel was also incorporated into the church, with a stained glass window by the same artist who was responsible for the design of the new altar, Hans Kock.

The church was re-inaugurated on 11 June 1989 with a ceremony that was attended by the leader of the German Democratic Republic, Erich Honecker. The big renovation project was at the time criticised, since it consumed large sums of money at a time when other churches were also in strong need of renovations. Not least the speech by Bishop Horst Gienke, conceived without consulting the leadership of the church, was critical. The inauguration sermon, with a bold sermon made by the pastor of the church, Puttkammer and attended by Berthold Beitz in his capacity of chairman of the Alfried Krupp von Bohlen und Halbach Foundation, which had provided funds for the renovation, was one of the last public appearances of Honecker before his fall, heralded by intense protests.

== Architecture ==
The church is constructed solely out of brick. It has the form of a basilica with a nave and two side-aisles. The nave is somewhat higher than the aisles; both the nave and the aisles walls have pointed, Gothic windows. The eastern wall has a trapezoid form and a richly articulated facade. The roof of the nave is made of copper, while the covering of the aisles are made of brick.

=== Interior ===
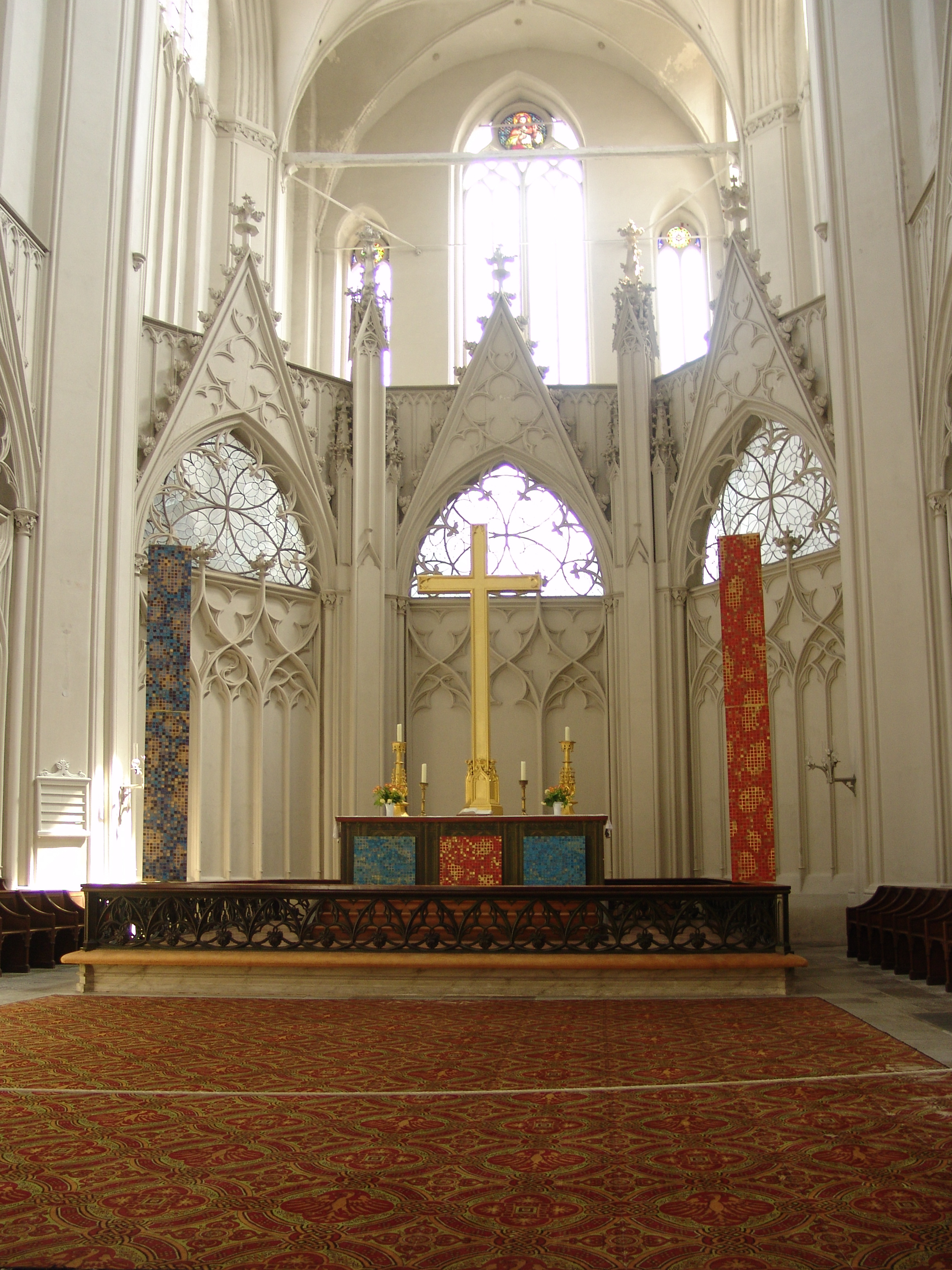
Main altar and choir wall

The church is c. 80 metres (260 ft) long and 30 metres (98 ft) wide. The entire inside of the church is still painted in a warm, sandstone-coloured tone. Eight pairs of pillars support the vaults. The ceiling over the main altar is higher and behind the altar the room is closed off by a richly decorated choir wall. A wooden gallery is placed on the western wall. There are some remains of medieval frescos on the side walls of the church. The floor is largely covered with tombstones; the oldest of these date from the 14th century.

=== Tower ===
The western tower has a height of 99.97 metres (328.0 ft). The square lower part of the tower is in its upper parts decorated with blind arcades. The slightly smaller middle part is flanked by four turrets with domed copper spires, and it is also decorated with blind arcades. The top part is even slimmer and has blind arcades in two storeys, while the spire of the church is a Baroque, copper spire consisting of two round cupolas, each mounted by a lantern, and topped with a pointed spire. 60 metres (200 ft) up in the tower there is a panorama platform which can be reached by a stair with 264 steps.

== Furnishings ==
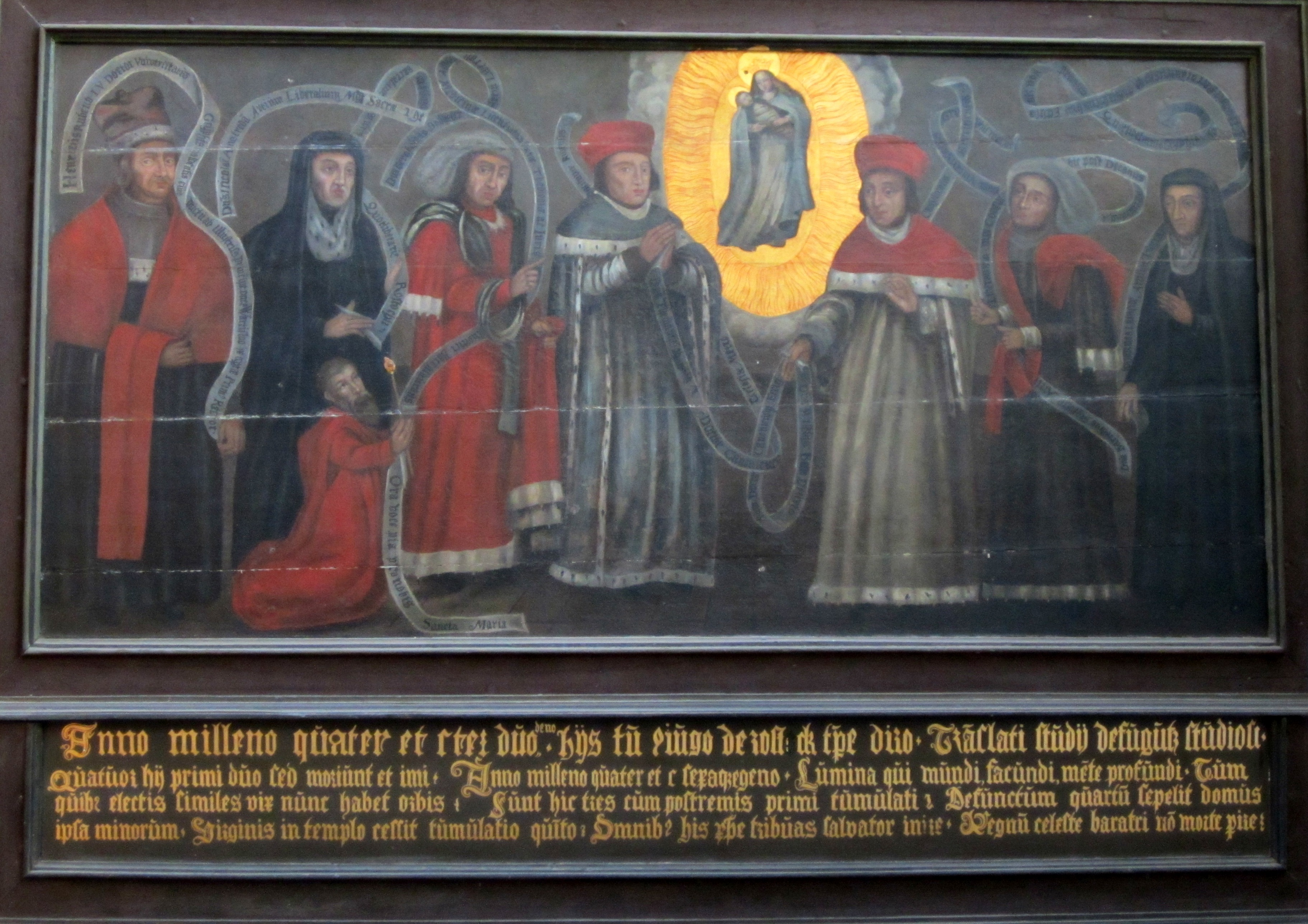
The Rubenow-Tafel

Very little remains of the medieval furnishings of the church. What remained of these after the destruction of 1650 was removed from the church at the latest in the 1790s. A medieval sculpture of Mary later came into the possession of the Catholic congregation in Stralsund. The large, Renaissance altarpiece was brought to a museum in Stralsund in 1876. Almost all the presently visible furnishings of the church date from the renovation an refurnishing of the church carried out in 1823–1832. All the wooden furnishings were made by Christian Adolf Friedrich, brother of painter Caspar David Friedrich. The choir wall is the most lavishly decorated of these furnishings. During the renovation in the 1980s, the church received a new altar made by limestone from Gotland as well as a new, larger-than-life crucifix, designed by Hans Kock. The organ dates from 1988 and was made by Jehmlich Orgelbau Dresden, reusing the organ case from 1832.

Two epitaph monuments dating from the time before 1650 are preserved in the church. One is from 1579 and commemorates the ducal chancellor Valentin von Eickstedt, while the other is from 1649 and erected in memory of the family of the mayor Christian Schwarz. There are also 29 memorials dedicated to priests of the church, dating between 1535 and 1929.

The only medieval item still in the church is the so-called Rubenow-Tafel, a painting made in 1460 and commissioned by the mayor and head of the University of Greifswald Heinrich Rubenow. It depicts Rubenow together with six professors from the university.
