= Kõpu Lighthouse =

Lighthouse in Estonia

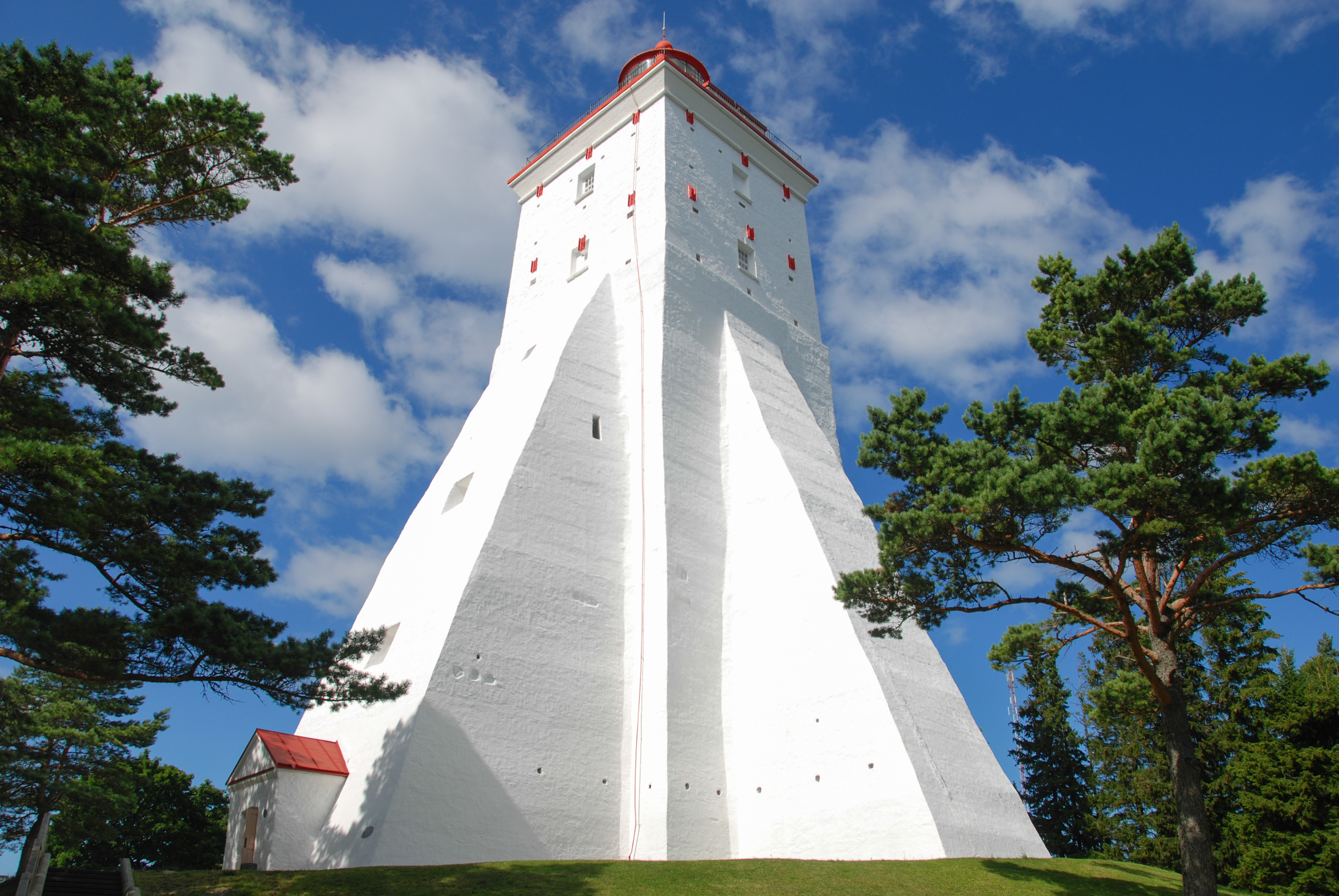
- The Kõpu Lighthouse in 2012
- Location: Hiiumaa, Mägipe, Hiiumaa Parish, Estonia
- Coordinates: 58°54′57″N 22°11′59″E

Tower
- Constructed: 1531
- Construction: monolithic limestone and granite boulder tower
- Automated: 1963
- Height: 37.7 m (124 ft)
- Shape: square tower with four buttresses, balcony and lantern room
- Markings: white tower with counterforts, red lantern room
- Power source: mains electricity
- Heritage: architectural monument

Light
- Focal height: 103.6 m (340 ft)
- Light source: LED
- Intensity: 2,100,000 candela
- Range: 26 nmi (48 km; 30 mi)
- Characteristic: Fl(2) W 10s
- Estonia no.: 668

The Kõpu Lighthouse (Estonian: Kõpu tuletorn) is one of the best-known symbols and tourist sites on the Estonian island of Hiiumaa. It is located in the village of Mägipe. It is one of the oldest lighthouses in the world, having been in continuous use since its completion in 1531. The lighthouse is quite unique with its shape and exceptional among lighthouses because it has gone through all the stages from a medieval landmark up to a modern electrified lighthouse.

The lighthouse marks the Hiiu Shoal (Estonian: Hiiu madal, Swedish: Neckmansgrund) and warns ships away from the shoreline. Light from Kõpu Lighthouse can be used for navigation as far as 26 nautical miles (48 km; 30 mi) away.

Kõpu Lighthouse was previously known by its Swedish name, Övre Dagerort.

== Location and design ==
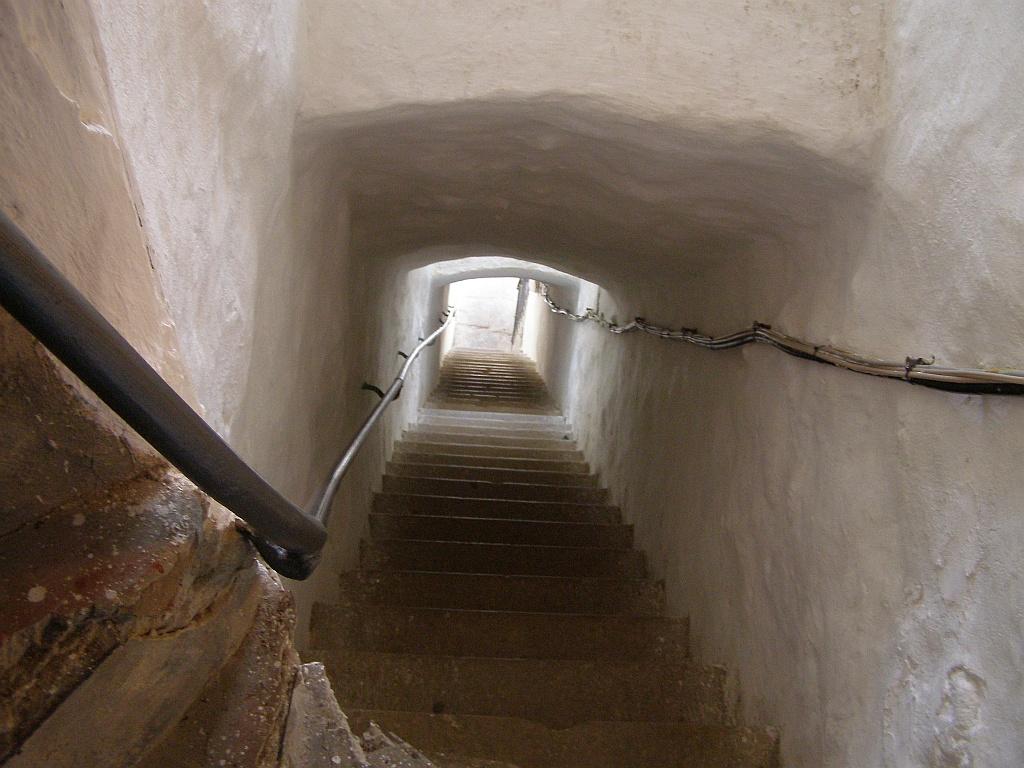
Stairway to the lighthouse

The lighthouse is built at the top of the highest hill of Hiiumaa island, Tornimägi (English: Tower Hill, 68 metres (223 ft)). The height of the building itself is 37.7 metres (124 ft), and the light is 103.6 metres (340 ft) above sea level, making it the highest coastal light on the Baltic Sea.

Kõpu Lighthouse has a shape of a square prism with massive buttresses in the four cardinal directions. The tower is laid solely of stone up to the height of 24 metres (79 ft). The outside layer of the walls is supported by lime mortar (and nowadays also cement), with the body itself built without mortar.

The body of the tower contains roughly 5,000 cubic metres (6,500 cu yd) of stone, with its total weight reaching 12,000 tonnes (26,000,000 lb). Local limestone and glacial erratic stones were used as building material.

Originally, the tower was solid stone without any rooms and no light was burned at it; when it was equipped with light, the top of the lighthouse was reached using external wooden stairs, which were later replaced with iron ones. During reconstruction in the 1800s, a stairway and two rooms were cut into the tower.

== Construction and history ==
=== Construction of the original tower ===
The most important east–west shipping lane in the Baltic Sea during the Middle Ages passed the Hiiu sandstone bank. Around 1490 the Hanseatic merchants asked the bishop of Bishopric of Ösel-Wiek to let them build a landmark on the Kõpu peninsula which was under the bishop's control. This action had no real results.

At a meeting of the Hanseatic League in Lübeck in 1499, they applied once more to the bishop for permission to build a beacon. On 20 April 1500 Bishop Johannes III Orgas (John Orgies) agreed to allow a massive stone pillar without any openings. To cover the building costs, Tallinn city council had to establish a special lighthouse tax until the sum was complete.

Building of the beacon was supposed to start in the summer of 1500, but construction was stopped when Wolter von Plettenberg, master of the Livonian Order, started a war which lasted until 1503. In the spring of 1504, purchase and delivery of the building materials began, but in the autumn of the same year the plague broke out, stopping the work once more. Building work was discontinued and alderman Lambert Ottingk, the magistrate in charge of the building, died in Tallinn on 28 December 1505.

The account ledgers of Tallinn city council contain entries about the Kõpu Lighthouse from 1507 to 1533, showing money was spent on the beacon of Hiiumaa from 13 May 1514 until 12 October 1532. The amounts show the majority of the work took place from 1514 to 1519; later there are only a couple of bigger expenditures on the beacon. But as completion of the beacon in Hiiumaa has been mentioned in the resolution of Wolmar Landtag in 25 February 1532 the actual time of completion and beginning of use of the tower must be 1531. Somewhere after 1538 height of the tower was increased.

The tower was unlit for more than one hundred years and was visible on a clear day up to 20 kilometres (12 mi) offshore.

=== Reconstruction into a lighthouse and rebuilding ===
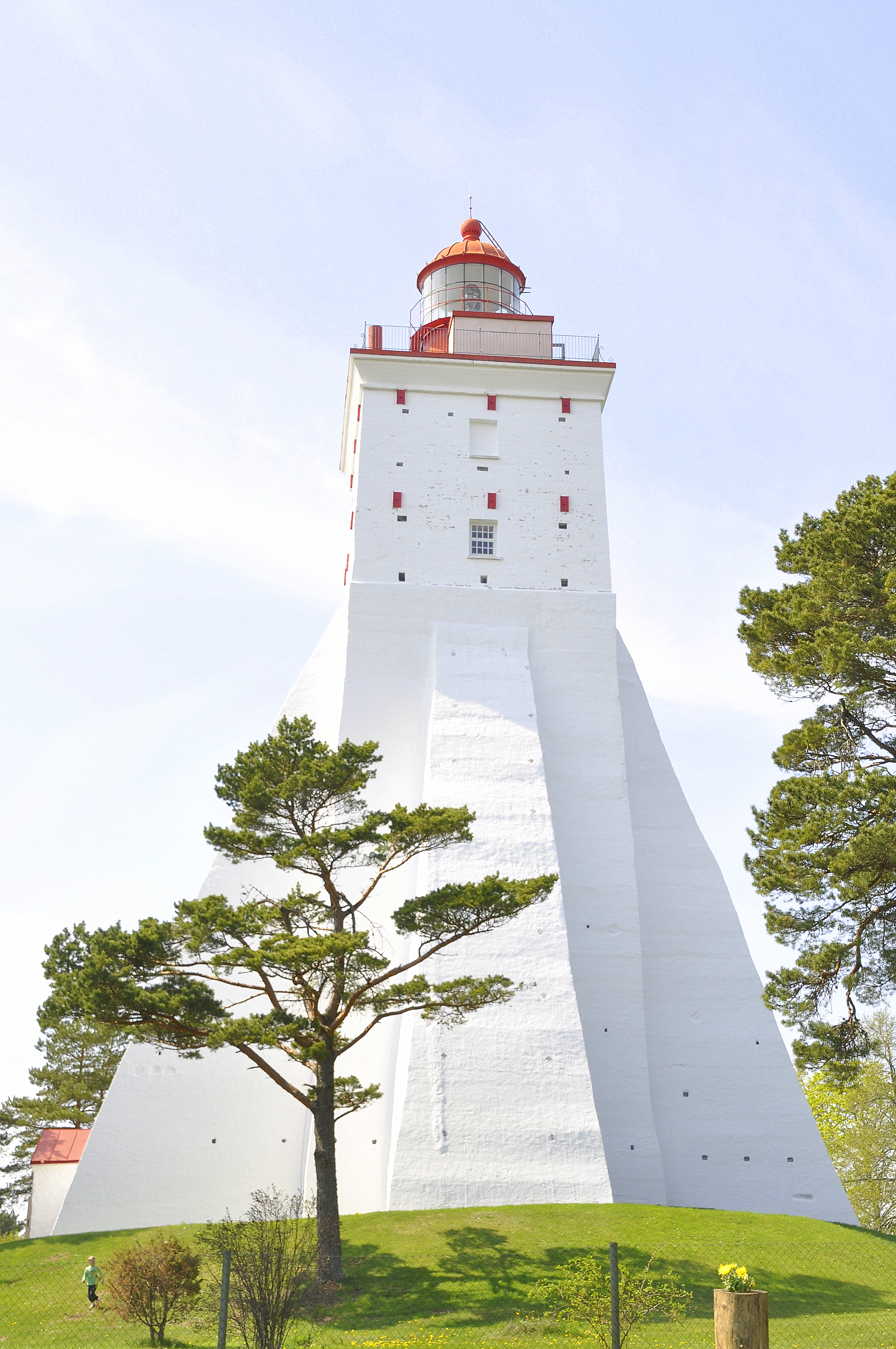
Kõpu Lighthouse in 2013

In August 1649 an open iron fire grate was affixed to the top of the tower and a wooden staircase was built to its outside wall. Originally it was planned to burn coal in the lighthouse, but due to high transport costs of coal, wood was used instead.

The fire consumed up to 1000 cords of firewood every year during the 180-day navigation period, a quantity so great that it led to deforestation of most of the Kõpu peninsula. A team of six was on guard every night, but storms often extinguished the fire. A rule passed in 1652 decreed that the fire must be strong and a fathom (~2 yards (1.8 m)) high.

Count Axel Julius De la Gardie bought the island of Hiiumaa from the King of Sweden for 38,000 thalers and took over management of the Kõpu Lighthouse in 1659. He had its height extended to 35.6 m (117 ft) and the wooden stairs replaced with an iron staircase. The light, now visible from as far as 24 kilometres (15 mi) away, was lit one hour after the sun set and extinguished one hour before sunrise.

The Russian Empire took over the administration of the lighthouse in 1810 and a major reconstruction of the tower began. A room for a team of six men was cut to the southern buttress and from there a stone staircase up to the tower. Two subsidiary rooms were cut into the upper part, one on top of the other, and a new lantern room was built on top of them. The lantern room housed twenty three oil lamps, using silver-plated brass reflectors. The lamps burned hemp oil, requiring 3.28 tonnes (7,200 lb) yearly.

In 1845, a crack in the upper part of the lighthouse called for extensive reconstruction, which saw part of the tower pulled down and rebuilt. The tower now gained its final height. A wooden structure with lamp-chimneys was built for the lantern and its optical devices.

The lighthouse came under navy control, and the first maintenance rules were laid down. The fire was to be lit and extinguished in strict accordance to sunrise and sunset. In cloudy weather lighthouse keepers were to consult a calendar for the necessary data. At that time, the fire was kept burning nightly from 1 July to 1 May—10 months of the year.

As part of his naval reforms, Grand Duke Constantine Nikolaevich of Russia demanded modernization of the Kõpu Lighthouse, in 1859. In May 1860, a novel rotating lantern (manufactured by Le Paute in Paris) was installed. It rotated at a speed of one revolution per four minutes, using a clockwork pulley-weight system. The device had one Carsel lamp with four concentric light sources and a Fresnel lens. The lamp consumed 0.5 kilograms (1.1 lb) of rapeseed oil hourly, and the fuel pump was powered by the same clockwork mechanism. It was said to be visible up to 27 nautical miles (50 km; 31 mi) away. A team of seven serviced the lighthouse, with one required to be near the light at all times.

The buttress with the staircase was roofed with wooden boards and tin sheets in 1869. A telegraph installation and rescue stations were established near the lighthouse in the same year; the first-established worked until 1898 when it was replaced by a telephone.

=== Twentieth century ===
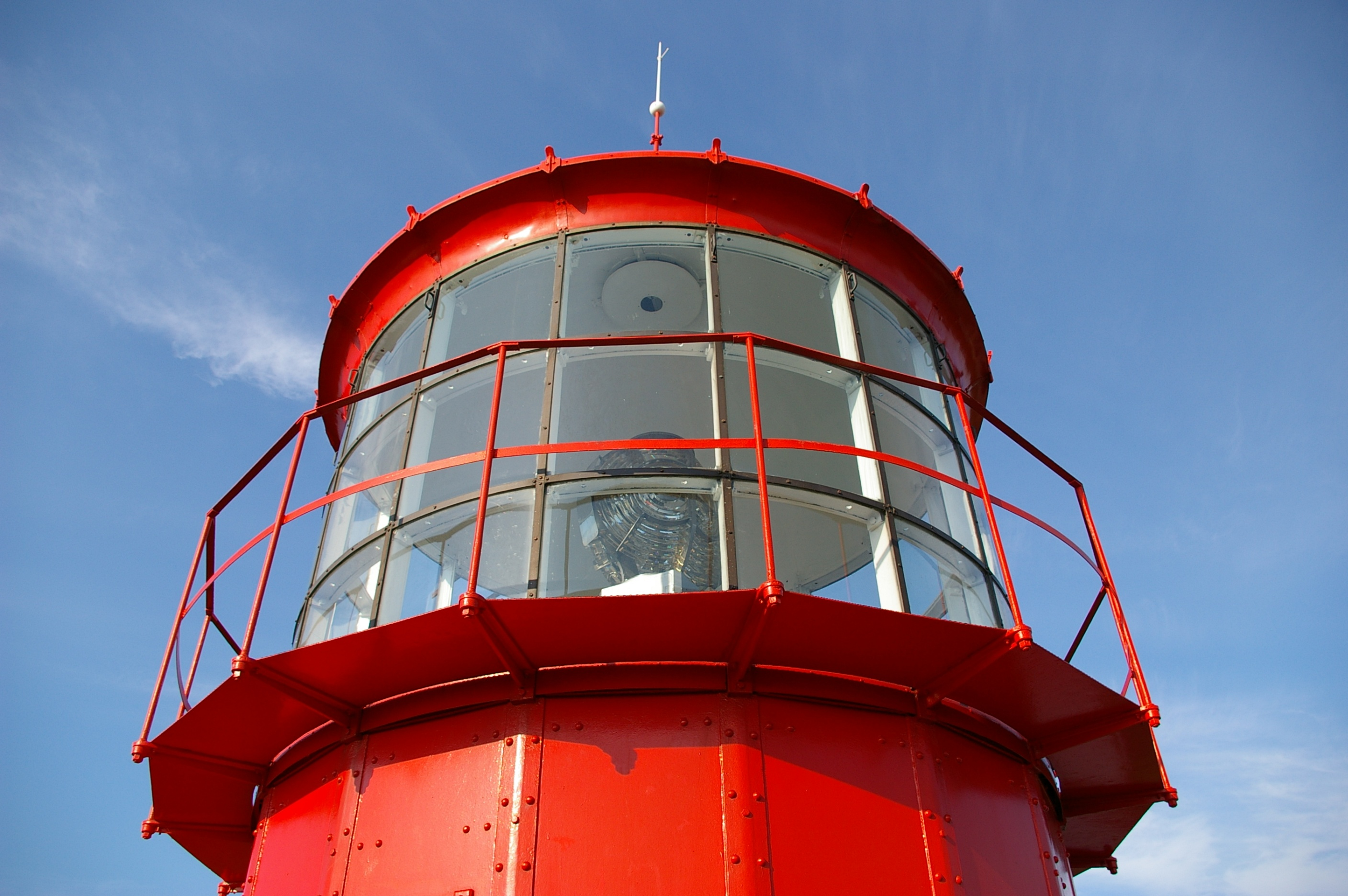
Lantern room of the Kõpu Lighthouse

A new light system was bought at the 1900 Paris World Fair, for three million gold rubles. The new apparatus (including the light chamber) was made by Sautter, Marlé & Co. It used a kerosene lamp with an incandescent mantle. A heavy cast iron system floated and rotated in a bath of mercury, which acted as a bearing. The bath contained roughly 500 kilograms (1,100 lb) of mercury. The poisonous mercury from the lighthouse was used for decades by children in the surrounding villages for playing.

The light system was set in rotation by a suspended 400 kilograms (880 lb) load; it needed to be rewound every two hours. It was installed during repairs of 1901.

German bombers targeted the lighthouse in August 1941, though only the lantern structure and optical system were destroyed.

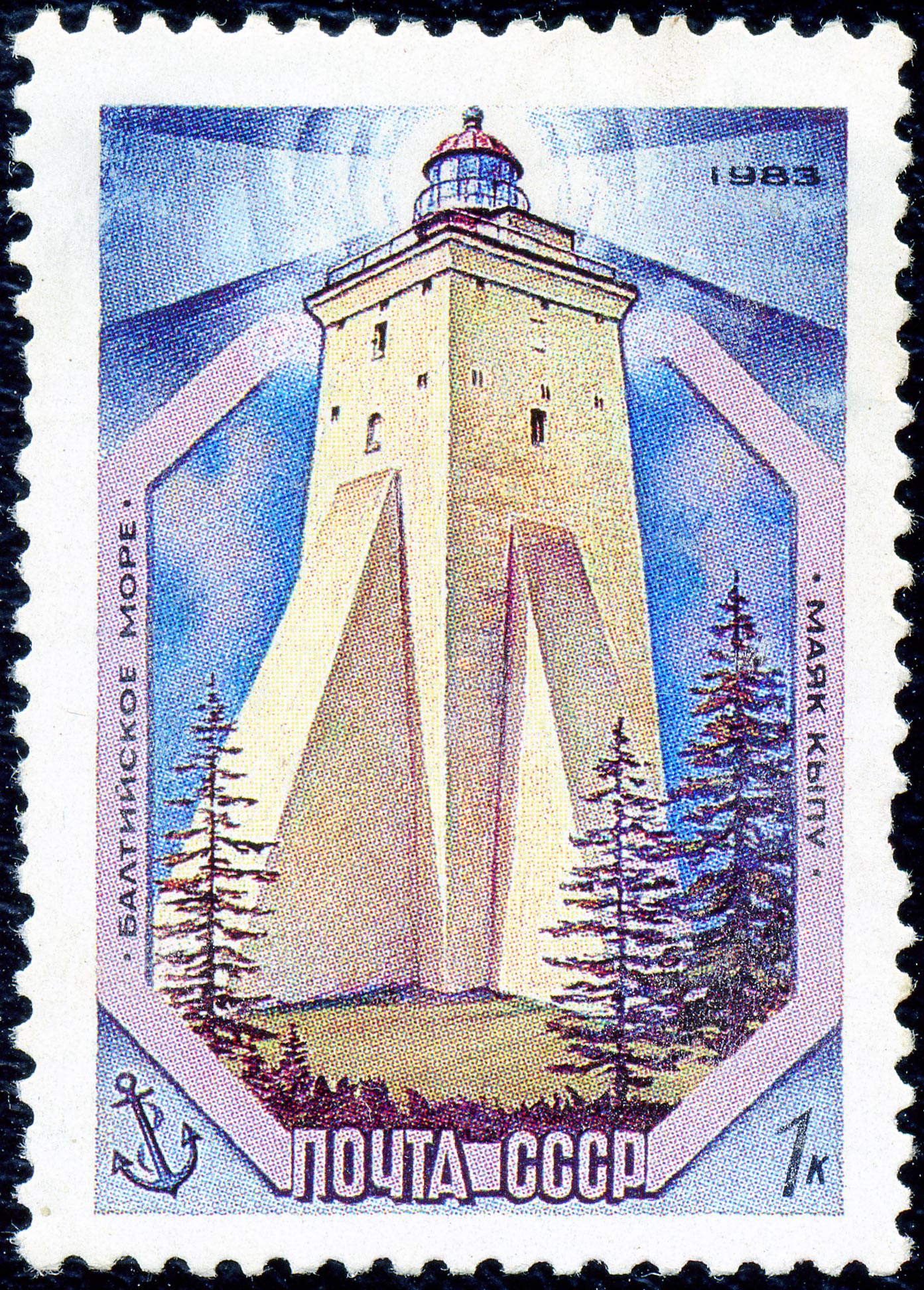
Kõpu Lighthouse on a Soviet stamp (1983)

After World War II, various optical systems were tested. Kohler generators were installed in 1949 along with the stationary electric light system. A new rotating light system (EMV-3) was installed in 1963, making the lighthouse fully automated. It was in use until 1982, when an experimental EMV-930M system (made in Ukraine) was installed. The rotation mechanism of the optical system was a novel solution – there are no electric motors; it uses a revolving magnetic field instead. The optics brought a six- to eight-hundredfold increase to the efficiency of the light radiated by a 1 kW quartz lamp.

Due to deterioration, the lighthouse underwent frequent repairs; major repairs were in completed in 1957 and 1970. During the repairs in years 1978–81 on the occasion of the 450th anniversary of the lighthouse, it was covered with a reinforced concrete shell and perchlorovinyl paint. As there was no white colour available, yellow was used. The paint blocked the way for humidity to escape from the body of the tower, and the old, degraded lime mortar began to get damaged by water freezing and melting in the inner surface of the cement mortar. By the mid-80s cracks appeared in the surface of the lighthouse and pieces of the cement mortar and smaller stones started falling off. During 1987 and 1988 two corners of the tower collapsed and emergency restoration was started. During the years 1989–90, to prevent collapsing of the lighthouse, a 15 centimetres (5.9 in) thick reinforced concrete shell was built to support the foundation and walls up to the top of the buttresses. The tower was painted with whitewash. Air channels were left in the concrete for ventilating the structure.

The lantern room of the lighthouse was renovated in 2001 and the tower was last repainted, with whitewash, in 2012. In 2020 a new powerful LED light source was installed in the existing lantern along with a new electronic control system. As of 2020, it is the most powerful LED-lighthouse light in the world with an intensity of 2,100,000 candela.

== Current status ==
The lighthouse is still in use as an aid to navigation and managed by Estonian Maritime Administration. Its future is also ensured by its status as a protected cultural monument.

Due to its enduring popularity and memorable shape, it is often used as a symbol of Hiiumaa. A major tourist attraction, the tower has been open for tourists since 1999. Together with the nearby Ristna lighthouse, the Kõpu Lighthouse was commemorated on a postage stamp in 2000.

== See also ==
- List of lighthouses in Estonia

== Notes ==
1. Most sources agree it is the third oldest operating lighthouse in the world (? Most probably the 4th, what about Hook Lighthouse in Ireland, 1240?), without mentioning what the other two are. They might be the Tower of Hercules and the Lighthouse of Genoa.
2. Some sources give the height of the hill as 67 m (220 ft) and some as 68 m (223 ft)
3. Different sources give different years for the start of the construction, for example, Baltic Lights has 1527–1531. All sources agree that the lighthouse was finished in 1531.
