= Hiiu Shoal =

Shallow in Estonia

Hiiu Shoal Nekmangrund Hiiu Madal
- Submerged bank Hiiu Shoal (Baltic Sea)
- Interactive map of Hiiu Shoal; Nekmangrund
- Coordinates: 59°3′N 22°15′E
- Country: Estonia
- County: Hiiu County
- Sea: Baltic Sea
- Area: Off Hiiumaa
- Minimum depth: 1.2 m

Hiiu Shoal (Estonian: Hiiu madal) or Nekmangrund is a shoal located in the Baltic Sea, off the northwestern shores of Hiiumaa Island. It is known as Neckmansgrund in Swedish, as Nekmangrund in Russian and as Neckmangrund in German, the loan translation in Estonian being Näkimadalad.

The submerged shoal is 9 kilometers long and 5.5 kilometers wide. Its shallowest point is only 1.2 meters deep at the time of the lowest astronomical tide.

== History ==
Since it is a dangerous shoal for ships entering the Gulf of Finland while approaching St. Petersburg, the Nekmangrund —a lightship of the Russian Hydrographic Office, was anchored on the reef until 1941.

During the war, the lightship Nekmangrund ("Hiiumadal" Estonian) was ordered to leave the shoal and return to Tallinn. During the night of June 23, 1941, at 1:30 in the night, it was hit by a German torpedo and sunk with the loss of at least 6 lives (there was confusion about who actually was aboard at the time).

The wreck of the ship lies now on the bottom of the Hiiu Shoal.

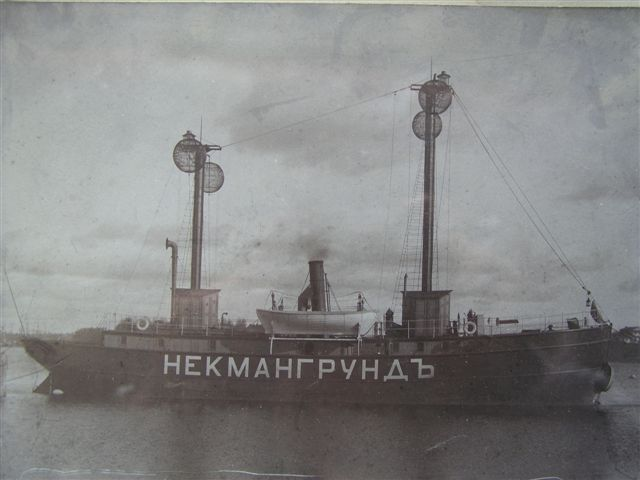
Lightship Nekmangrund (1898)

The Sheaf Water, a cargo ship of the United Kingdom, ran aground on the Nekmangrund Shoal on 19 June 1933. She was refloated a week later.

In 1984 Estonian writer Herman Sergo published the novel Näkimadalad, whose title is based on the name of the shoal. In his three-volume work Sergo portrays the tragic fate of the Estonian Swedes of Reigi village, located to the south of the shoal on Hiiumaa Island, which were deported in the 18th century to Southern Ukraine following a Russian Imperial decree.

== See also ==
- Kõpu Lighthouse
- List of shipwrecks in 1933
- Russian lightvessels
