= Carl Ludvig Lithander =

Estonian-Swedish composer and military officer

- Born: 26 January 1773; Reigi
- Died: 17 December 1843 (aged 70); Greifswald
- Occupations: Officer; Teacher; Organist; Composer
- Organisations: Military Academy Karlberg; St. Nikolai, Greifswald

Carl Ludvig Lithander (26 January 1773 – 17 December 1843) was an Estonian-Swedish composer and military officer. He was born and raised in Estonia, but following the death of his parents he settled in Sweden, where he became an officer specialised in fortifications in 1795. He worked as a teacher at the Military Academy Karlberg until 1812. Two years later he left Sweden to pursue a purely musical career. He spent four years in London, and probably also time in Berlin, the Netherlands and Denmark, before settling in Greifswald in 1824, where he found employment as organist in the city's main church, St. Nikolai. He would remain in Greifswald until his death. He composed several works mainly intended to be played at home or in salons, mostly for piano, for piano and flute, and songs for piano.

== Biography ==
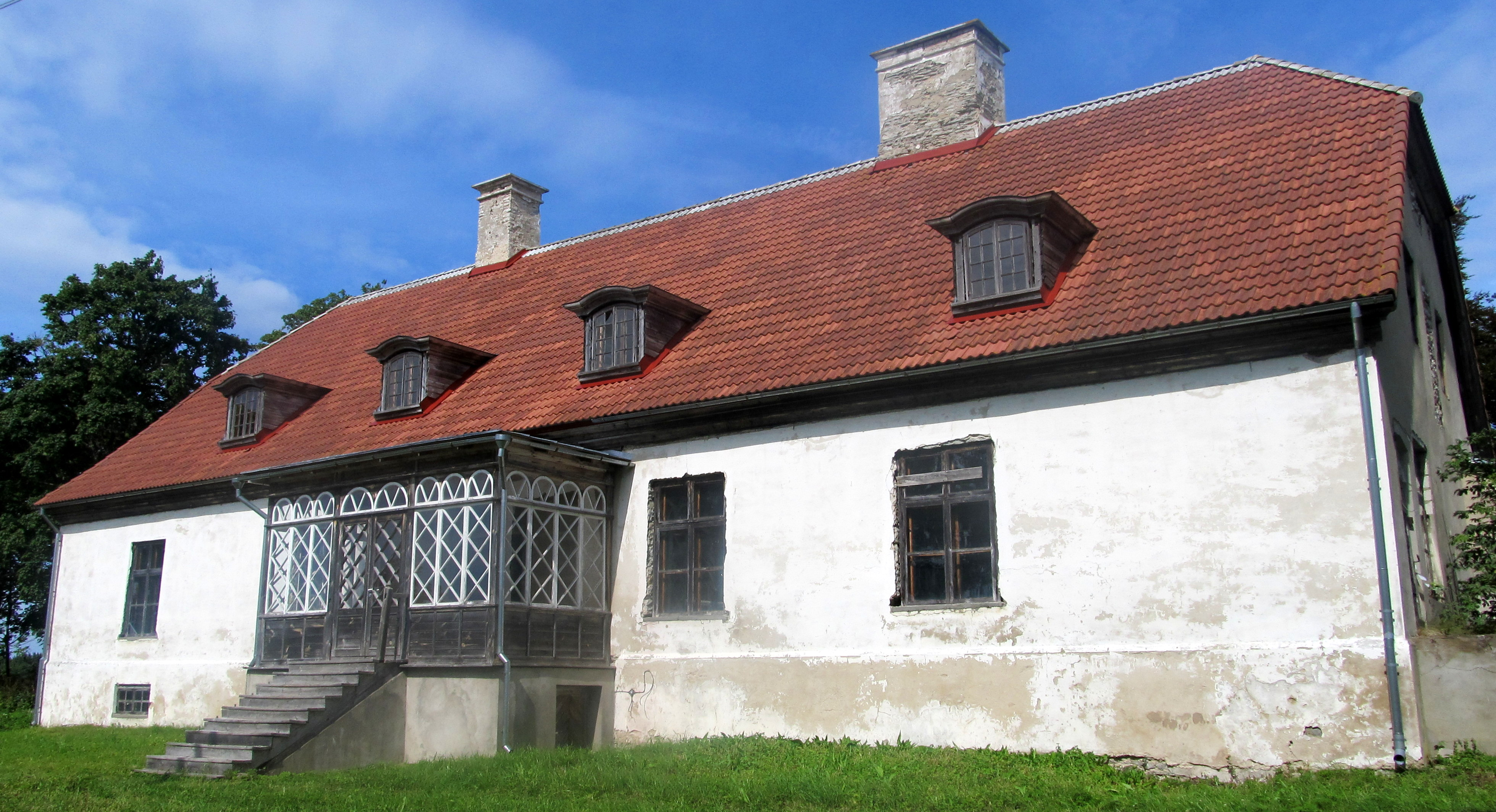
The vicarage at Reigi, Estonia, birthplace of Carl Ludvig Lithander, whose father was vicar of the village.

Carl Ludvig Lithander was born in Reigi, on the island of Hiiumaa, which is now part of Estonia but at the time formed part of the Reval Governorate of the Russian Empire. He came from an Estonian-Swedish family and was the oldest of 11 siblings. His father was a vicar. The family moved to Noarootsi on mainland Estonia a year after the birth of Carl Ludvig. His parents died within months of each other in the winter of 1788–1789, and the children were forced to move to relatives in Turku, in Finland. Due to the ongoing Russo-Swedish War, it was however not possible to cross the Gulf of Finland. Instead, the siblings travelled around the southern end of the Baltic Sea, via Riga to Königsberg.

Carl Ludvig Lithander appears to have stayed briefly in Königsberg, as he is listed as enrolled at the university there; in 1790 he however enrolled in Uppsala University in mainland Sweden. The following year he resided with an uncle in the Swedish capital Stockholm, left the university and joined the military instead. He graduated as an officer specialised in fortification in 1795. He thus never reached Turku and Finland, but kept in close contact with his siblings who had settled there, and who shared his musical interests. For example, he facilitated the procurement of a new piano, made in Stockholm, for the Musical society of Turku on their behalf.

From 1804 he was employed as a teacher of mathematics at the Military Academy Karlberg, where he also was granted living quarters, and from 1809 as a lecturer in geometry and trigonometry. He was promoted to the rank of lieutenant in 1812, but two years later left active military service. During his time in the military, he also took music lessons from Georg Joseph Vogler and Johann Christian Friedrich Hæffner, and began producing musical compositions himself. Between 1801 and 1814 he was organist at Klara Church in Stockholm.

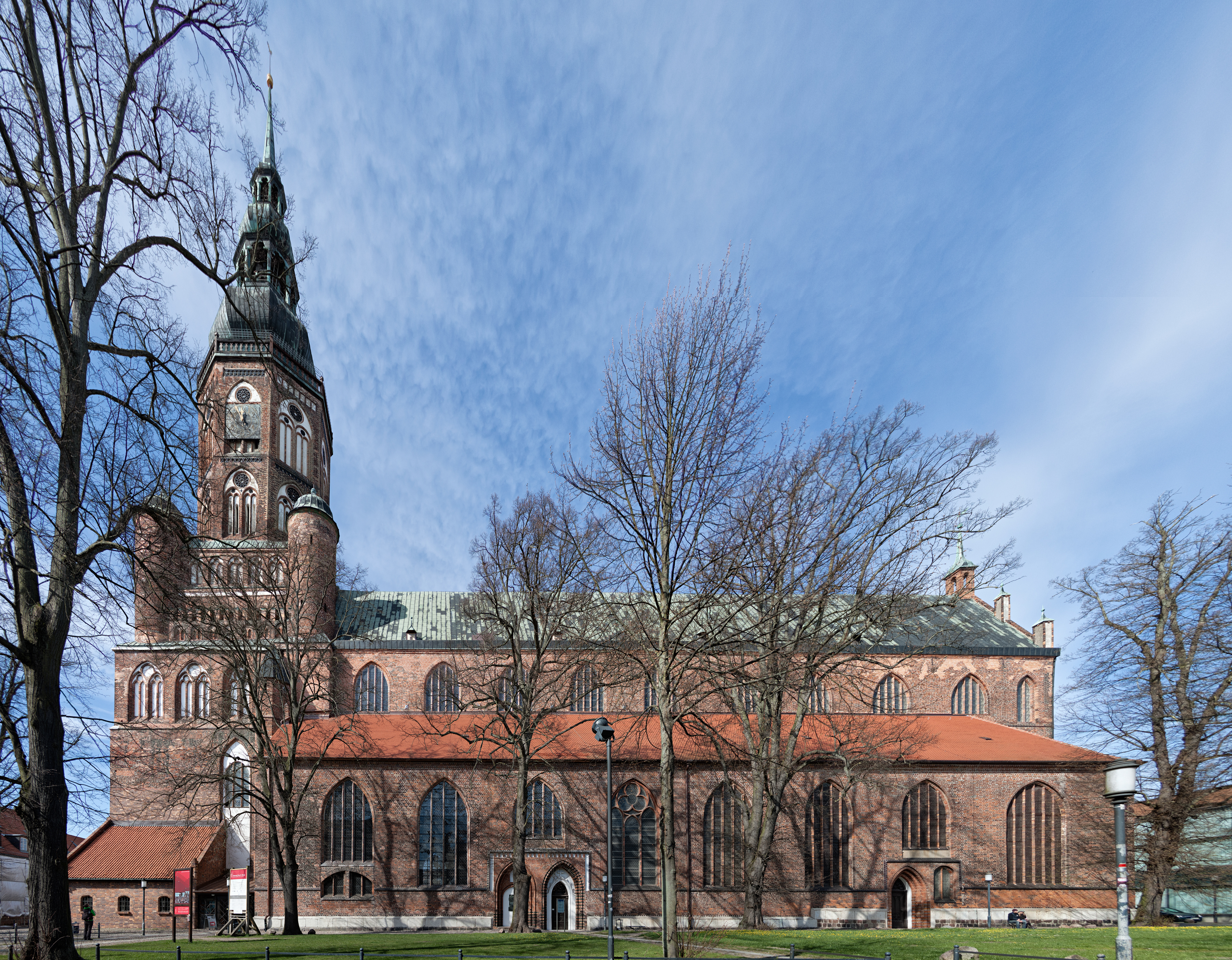
St. Nikolai, Greifswald, where Lithander was the organist from 1824.

After leaving the military he then began an itinerant life dedicated to music. He first settled with his family in London, where he appears to have lived for four years, earning a living as a music teacher and keyboardist, all the while writing numerous new musical compositions. He probably also spent time in Berlin, the Netherlands, and Denmark. In 1824 he found employment as the organist of St. Nikolai, the main church of Greifswald in Pomerania on the southern Baltic Sea coast. He retired in 1839 but would remain in Greifswald until the end of his life.

He married Eva Theresia Berndtsson from Sala. The couple had twin daughters who were also musically gifted. Carl Ludvig Lithander's brother Fredrik Emmanuel was also a professional musician, working as a private music teacher and composer in Saint Petersburg.

== Works ==
Lithander composed works mainly intended to be played at home and in salons, and within this genre he was well up to date with the stylistic developments of his time. They include works for piano, for piano and flute, and songs for piano, as well as comic operas and pieces for organ. Few unpublished works by Lithander remain, but his published works were widely disseminated across Europe.
