= Herman Sergo =

Estonian writer

Herman Sergo (1 October 1911 in Jausa, Käina Parish, Hiiu County – 28 September 1989) was an Estonian writer. His works depict mainly the life of seafarers and coastal dwellers.

Until 1932, he worked as a sailor on Swedish and Finnish long-distance vessels. Until 1955, he worked at several maritime-related positions. Since 1955, he was a professional writer.

His most notable work is the historical trilogy "Näkimadalad" ('Mermaid Shallows'). 1978–1988, Estonian Television did 4-part mini-series "Näkimadalad". The series were directed by Olav Neuland.

== Works ==
- novel "Meri kutsub" (1960)
- novel "Pinnavirvendus ja põhjalained" (1962)
- novel "Kajakalaid" (1963)
- novel "Põgenike laev" (1966)
- novel "Vihavald" (1970)
- novel "Kodusadam" (1982)
- novel "Näkimadalad" I–III (1984)
- novel "Randröövel" (1988)
- novel "Rukkirahu" (1988)
