= Käina Bay =

Bayi in Hiiumaa Rural Municipality, Estonia

- Käina laht
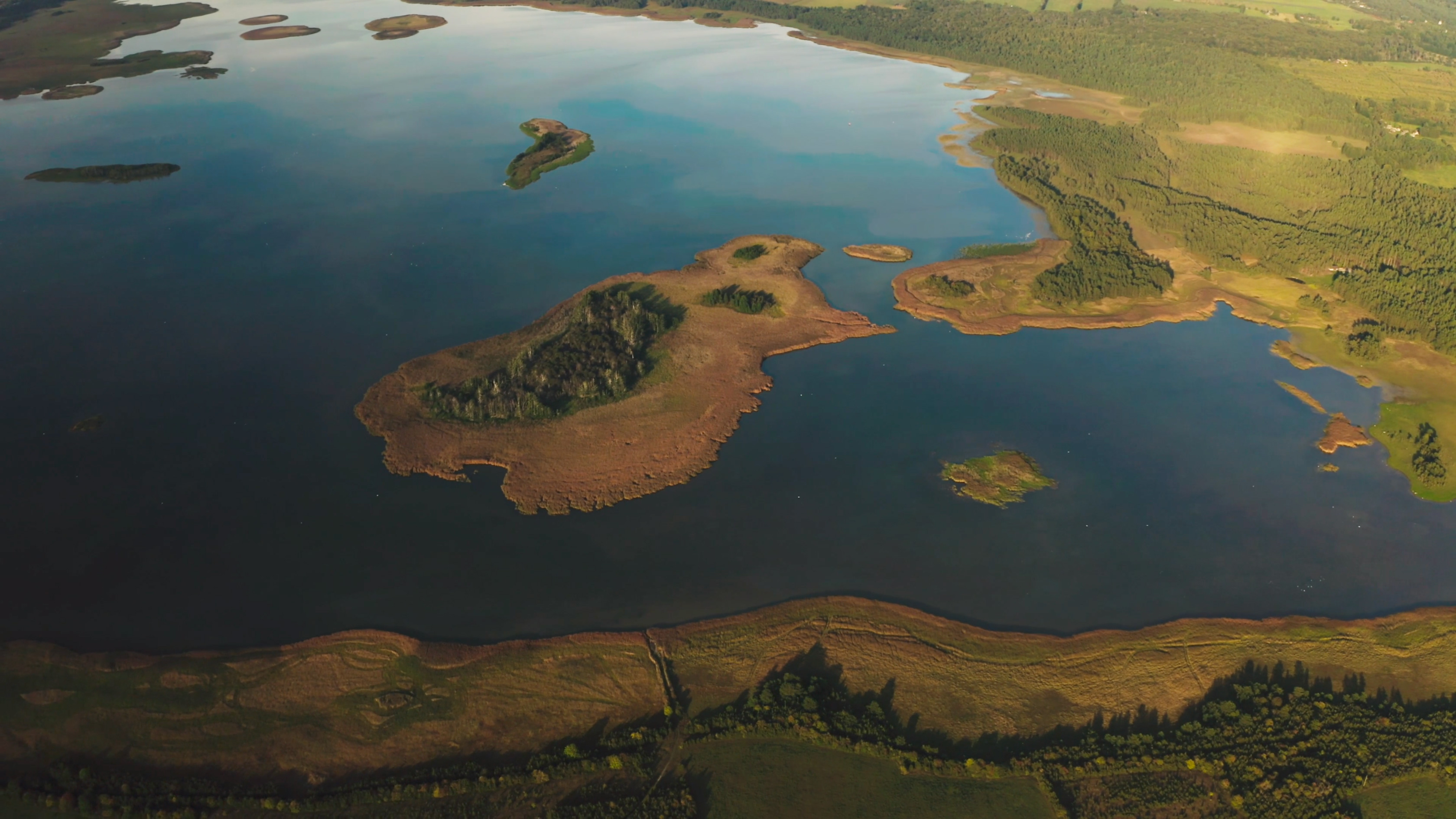

- Location within Estonia
- Location: Baltic Sea
- Coordinates: 58.805°N 22.786°E
- Type: lake
- Part of: Väinameri
- Basin countries: Estonia
- Max. length: 5 km (3.1 mi)
- Max. width: 3 km (1.9 mi)
- Surface area: 9 km^{2} (3.5 sq mi)
- Average depth: 0.34 m (1 ft 1 in)
- Max. depth: 1 m (3 ft 3 in)
- Water volume: 4,000,000 m^{3} (140,000,000 cu ft)
- Islands: 23
- Settlements: Käina borough, Orjaku village

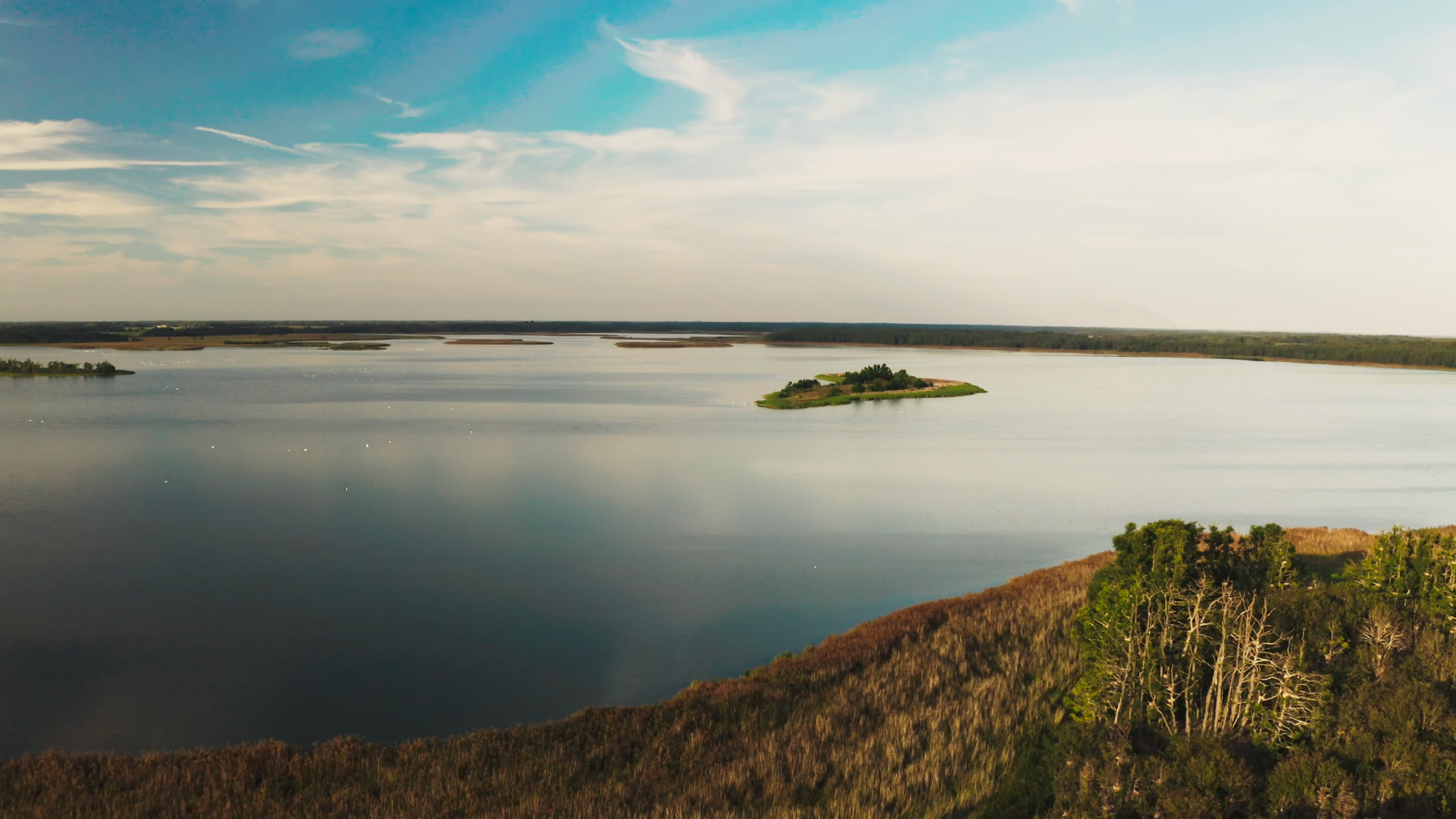
Käina Bay (view from north-west)

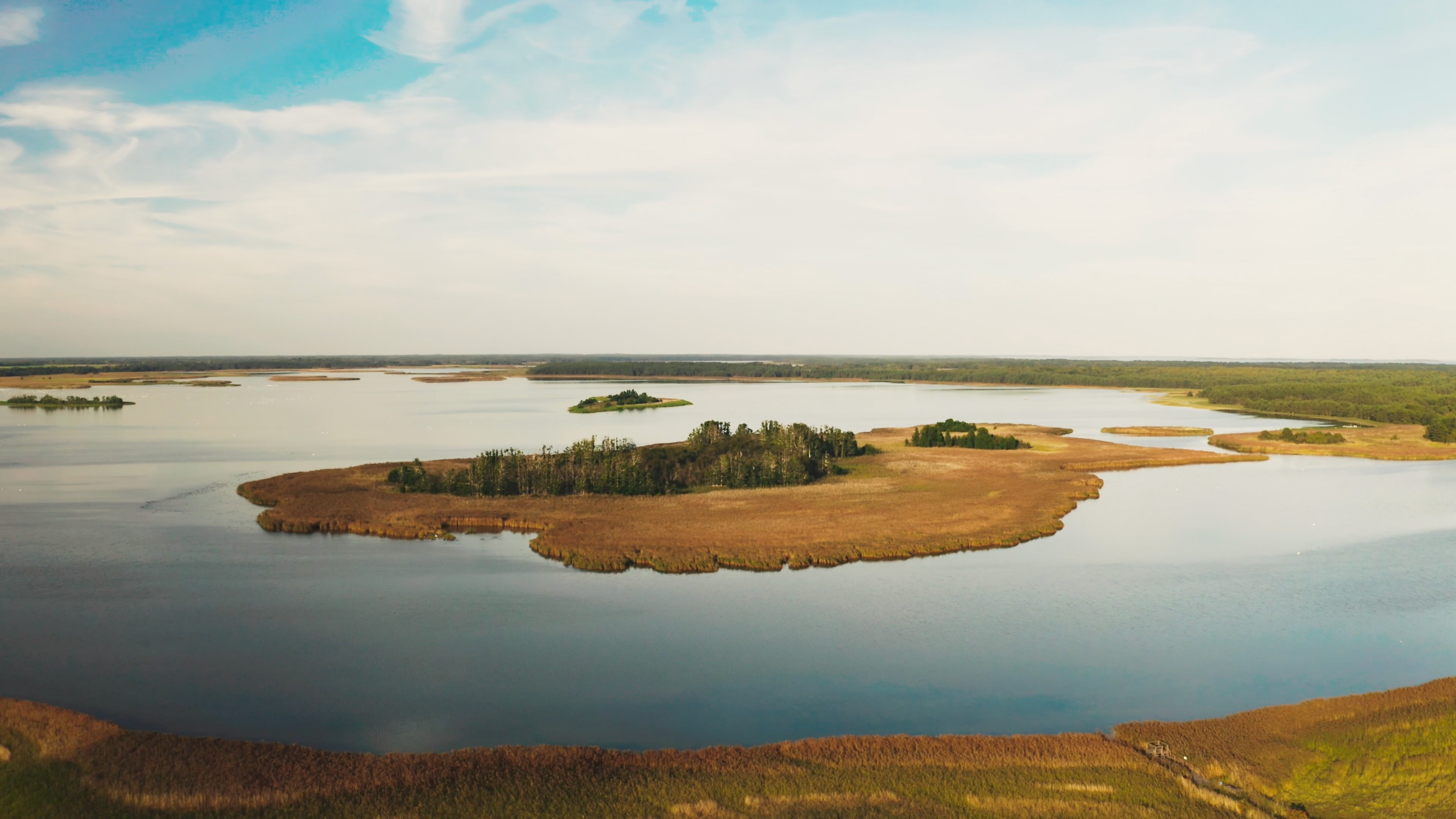
Käina Bay (aerial eastward view)

Käina Bay (Estonian: Käina laht) is almost isolated and very shallow approximately 9 km^{2} (3.5 sq mi) marine area between the Estonian islands Hiiumaa and Kassari, which is connected to the surrounding Väinameri and adjacent Vaemla Bay via three tiny channels - Orjaku channel, Orjaku sill and Vaemla (Laisna, Õunaku) channel. The maximum depth of Käina Bay is about 1 meter. Käina Bay is separated from the Väinameri Sea by Kassari Island, Õunaku Bay and Jausa Bay by a dyke road. There are many thickets of reeds and islets (23). In the southern part of the bay there is mineral curative mud.

== Water regime ==
Average high water level in Käina Bay lasts from November until March and critically low water level period is from April until June. Most extreme changes in the sea level; onto which water level in the bay reacts with certain time lag, occur in the open sea from September until March, when stronger winds prevail. Sea level variability in the Käina Bay is smaller comparing to Baltic Sea. Two types of water exchange regime occur in the Käina Bay, which depend on the water level in the open sea. In the case of higher sea level water in the Vaemla Bay rises faster due to transport through Õunaku sill comparing to Käina Bay and as a consequence, open sea water arrives to the Käina bay also through Vaemla channel. In the case of lower sea level water exchange through Õunaku sill does not occur and therefor saltier water inflow (outflow) to (from) the Vaemla Bay occurs through Käina Bay.

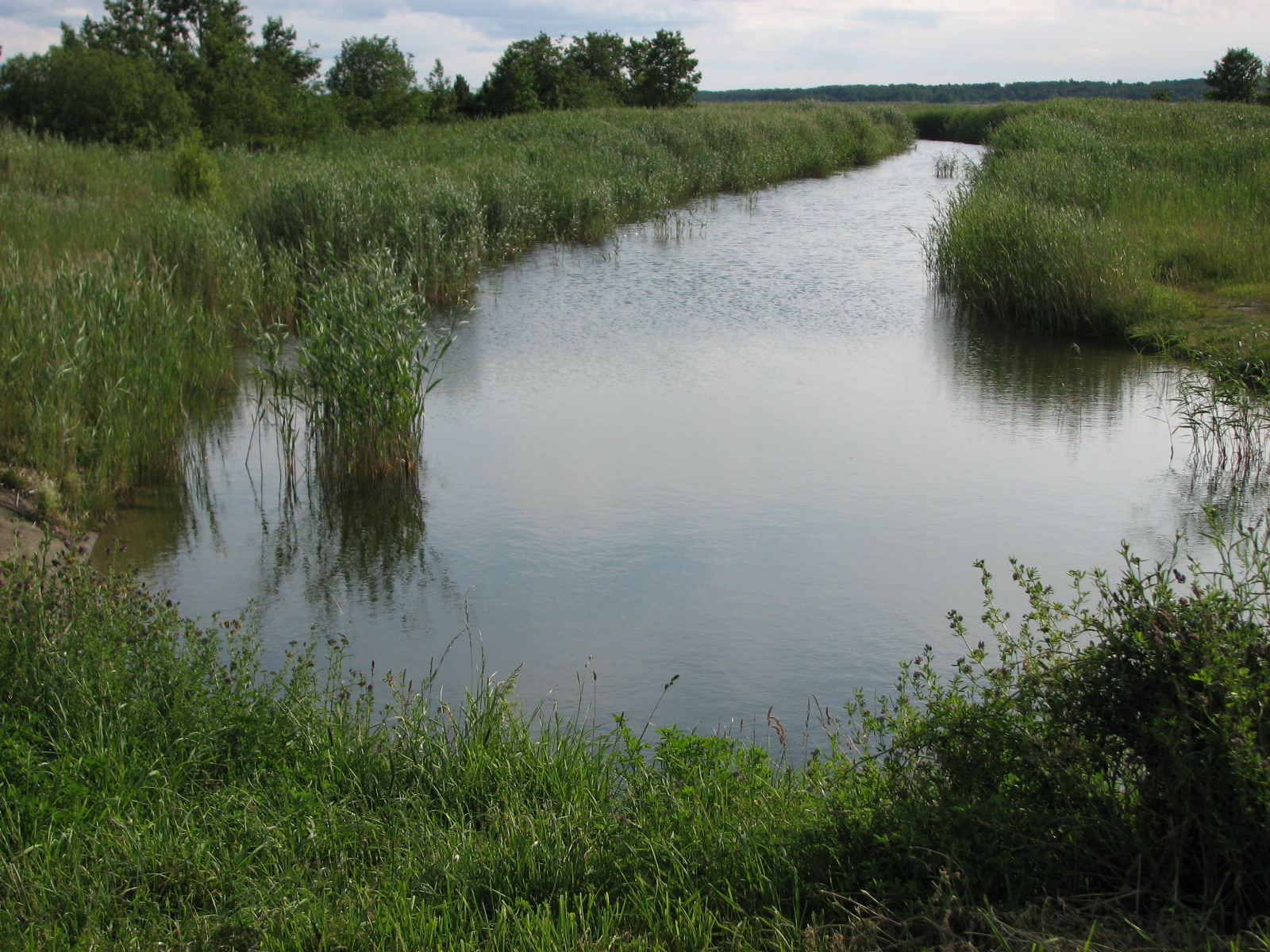
Orjaku channel from the Käina Bay

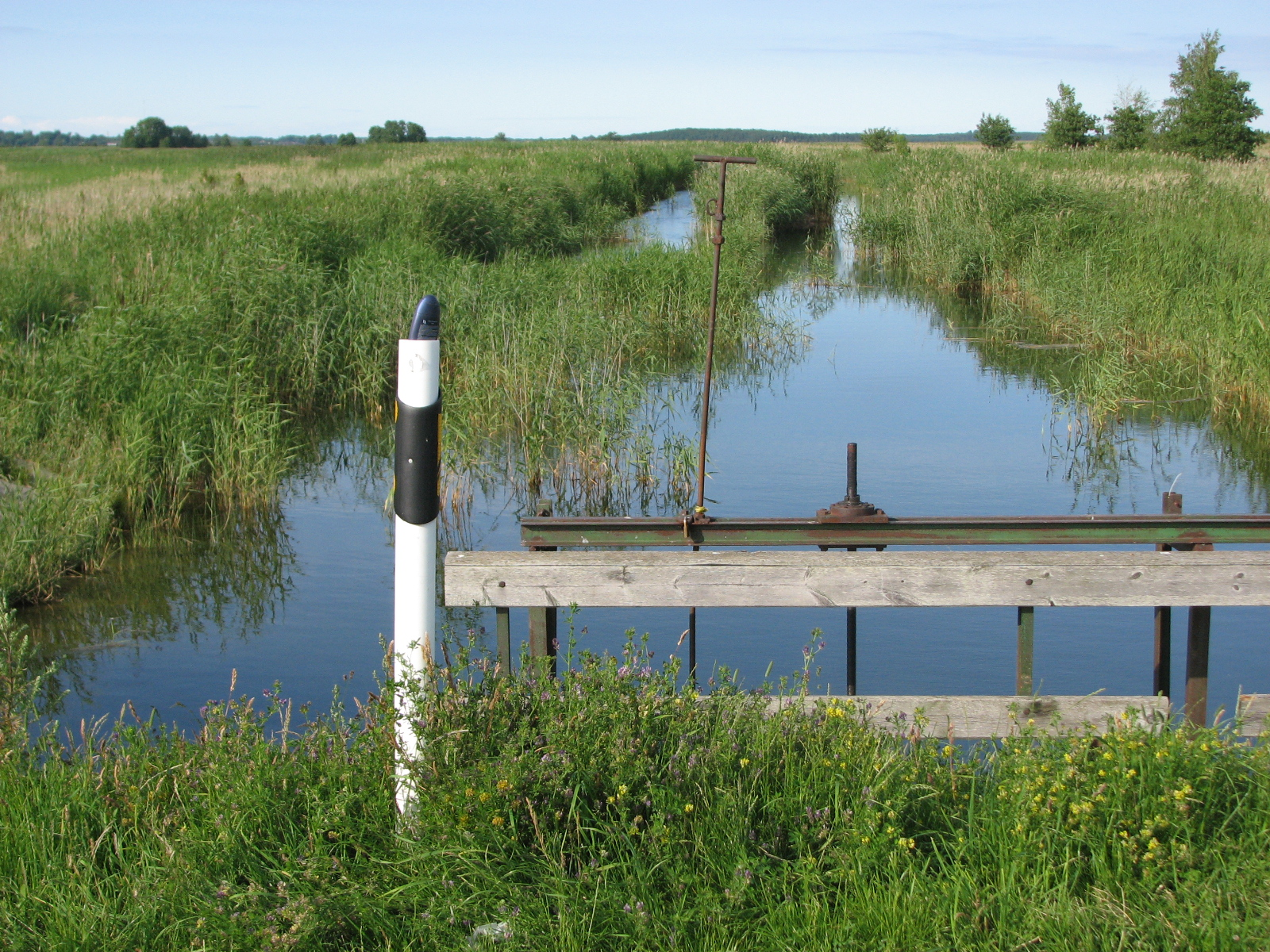
Orjaku channel to the Käina Bay

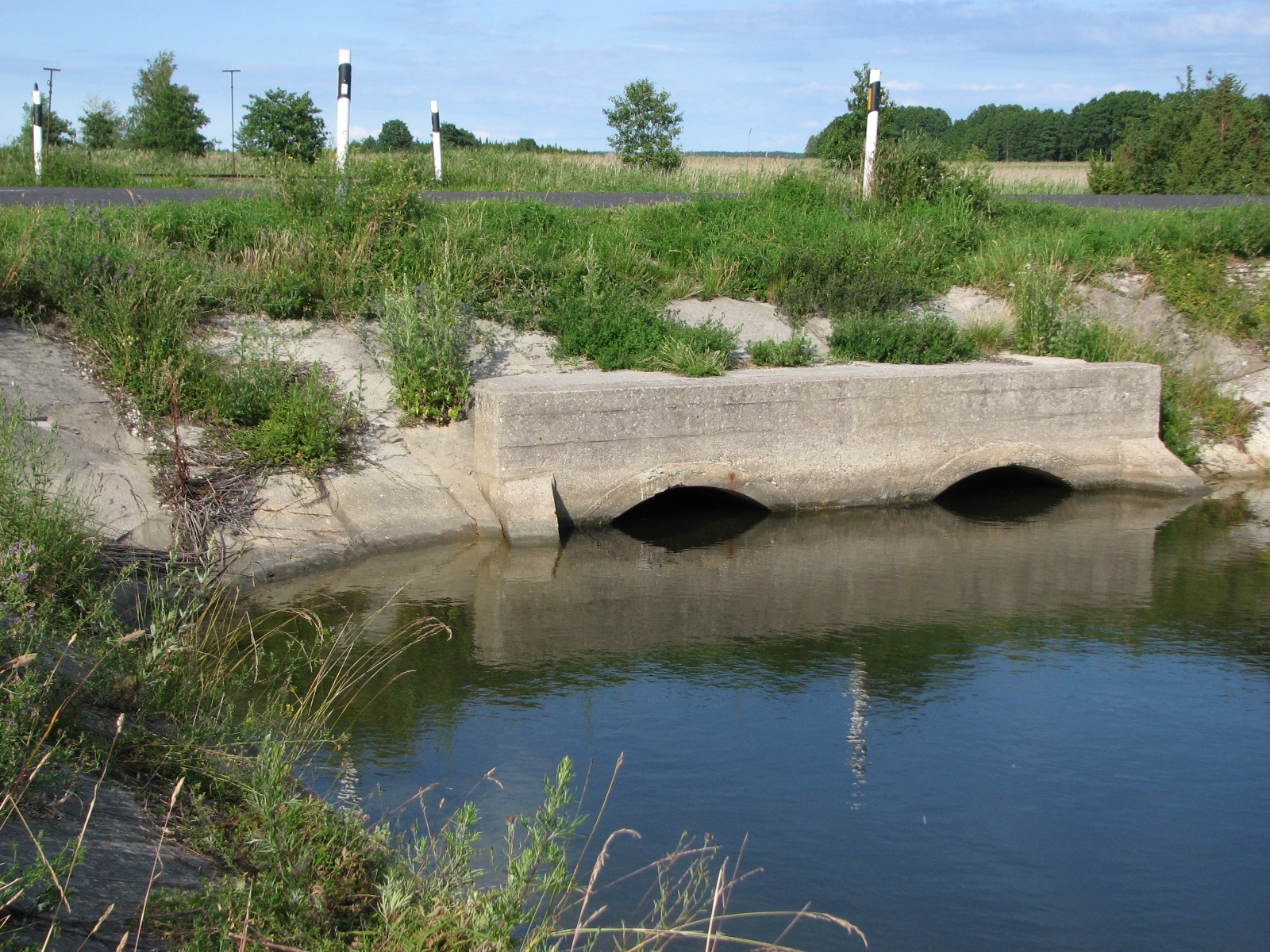
Orjaku channel entrance to the Väinameri

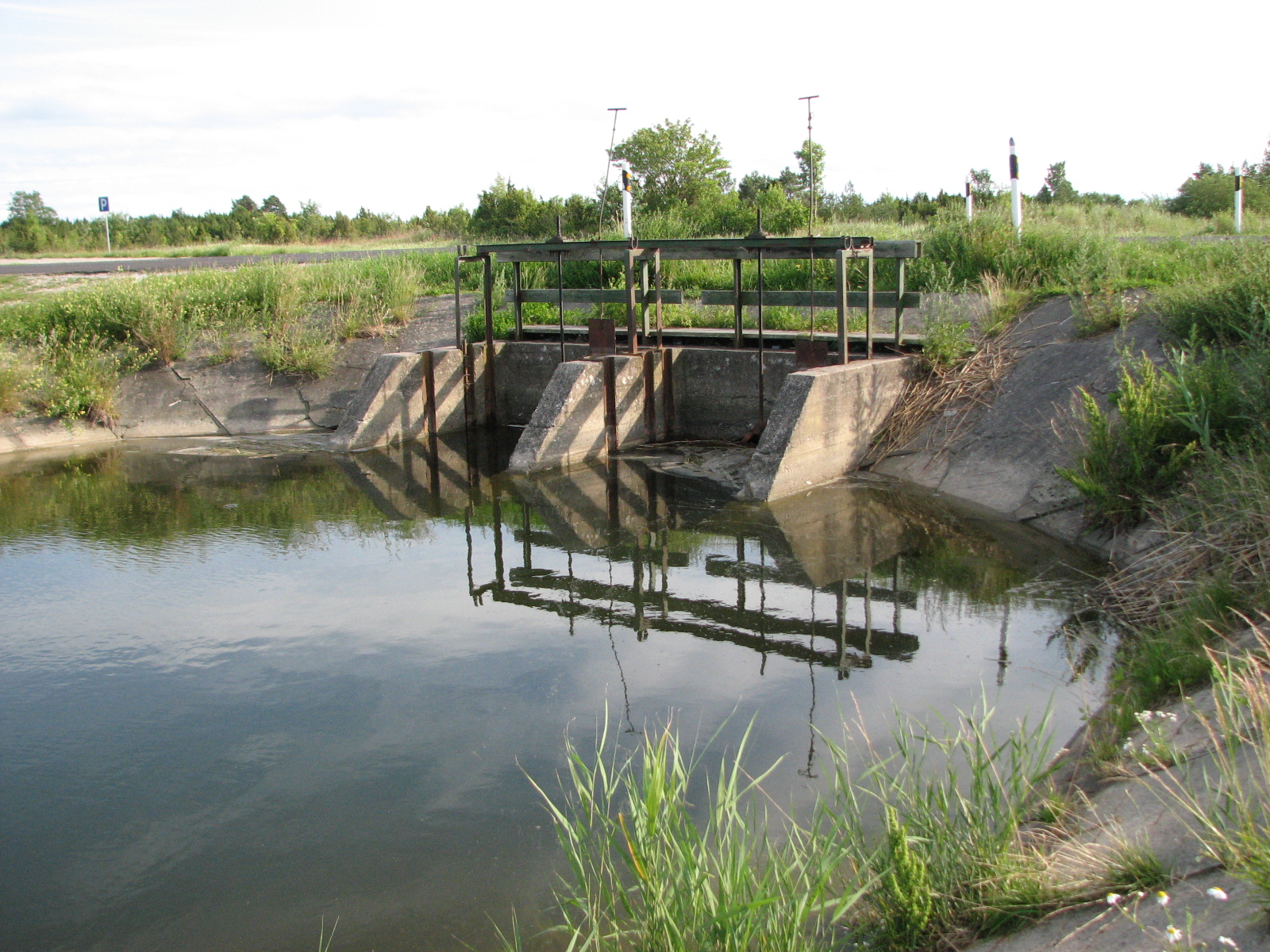
Orjaku channel culvert under the road

== Protected nature area ==
=== Landscape Reserve ===
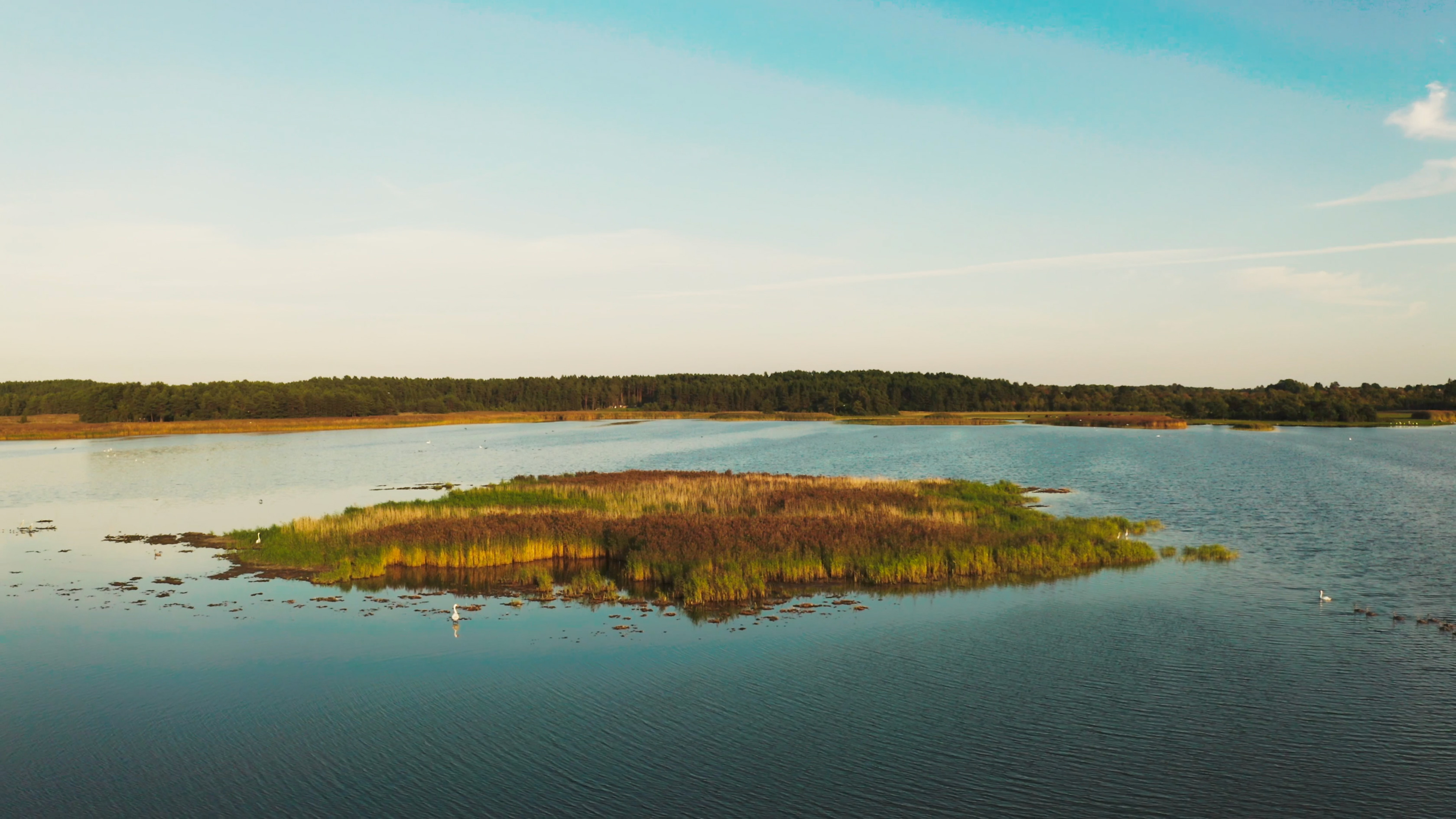
Islet Lõunarahu in Käina Bay

Käina Bay-Kassari Landscape Conservation Area (KLO1000508) is one of 152 protected areas of Estonia. Total area of the reserve is 5,681.2 ha (14,039 acres), including areas permanently covered by water 2,475.5 ha (6,117 acres). The history of this protected area dates back to 1939, when the Kassari and Vaemla Bay curative mud areas were protected. In 1962, two protected areas were established: the Kassari Island Landscape Protection Area and the Käina Bay Ornithological Protection Area, which were merged to form the Käina Bay-Kassari Landscape Protection Area in 1998.

This area is maintained and improved with the support of various public funds, including support from the European Union Cohesion Fund and Environmental Investment Centre environmental programme. Vaemla region at the Käina Bay-Kassari Landscape Reserve on the south-eastern edge received the necessary tools for coastal meadow maintenance.

The channels would ensure normal water exchange in the bay and at the same time create a favorable condition for the local habitats and species. Based on the 2017 study of the Taltech Department of Marine Systems about the condition of Käina Bay and Vaemla Bay, and the efficiency of water regulators and recommendations therein, the works in the watercourses were implemented in May 2020. During the works, reeds and sediment were removed from Puulaiu, Orjaku sill and Laisna channel. The works commissioned by the Environmental Board were financed from the European Union Cohesion Fund within the framework of investments in the project “Preservation and Restoration of Protected Species and Habitats”.

=== Ramsar Site ===
Hiiumaa islets and Käina Bay site has been listed the list of Ramsar sites in Estonia as one of 17 Estonian wetlands of international importance. The Hiiumaa Islets and Käina Bay site (17,700 ha (44,000 acres)) is a complex of coastline and small islands on the southeast coast of Hiiumaa Island, which in turn lies off the west coast of the Estonian mainland. The area is hydrologically highly prized for the prevention of coastal erosion, sediment trapping, maintenance of water quality, and support of food chains. Here, too, rich communities of endangered orchids can be found. The mix of state and private lands supports about 100 inhabitants but is an important area for fishing and ecotourism, as well as for environmental education, scientific research, and curative sea mud (peloid).

=== Biosphere reserve ===
West Estonian Archipelago, including Käina Bay, was from 1990 listed as UNESCO Biosphere Reserve which are wholly or partially World Heritage sites.

== Mineral resource deposit ==
According to the Earth's Crust Act and Environmental Register national mineral resource Käina sea mud deposit is located in the western part of Käina Bay, where near Orjaku village organic mineral mud is being excavated and used by the cosmetics industry, for curative purposes and SPA industry. Estonian mineral mud has been studied extensively in the past. The latest research was conducted in 2013-2014 by Centre of Excellence in Health Promotion and Rehabilitation (Estonian: Tervisedenduse ja Rehabilitatsiooni Kompetentsikeskus). The results confirm that Käina Bay contains the most mineral sediments and the lowest concentrations of heavy metals out of all analyzed mud deposits in Estonia. On the lithological composition on average Käina Bay peloid contains 91.4% of minerals, 6.5% of organic matter, and 3.7% of carbonates. The sediments in Käina Bay are ecologically cleanest in Estonia.
