= Käina seamud deposit =

Seamud deposit in Estonia

Coordinates: 58.801392°N 22.773128°E

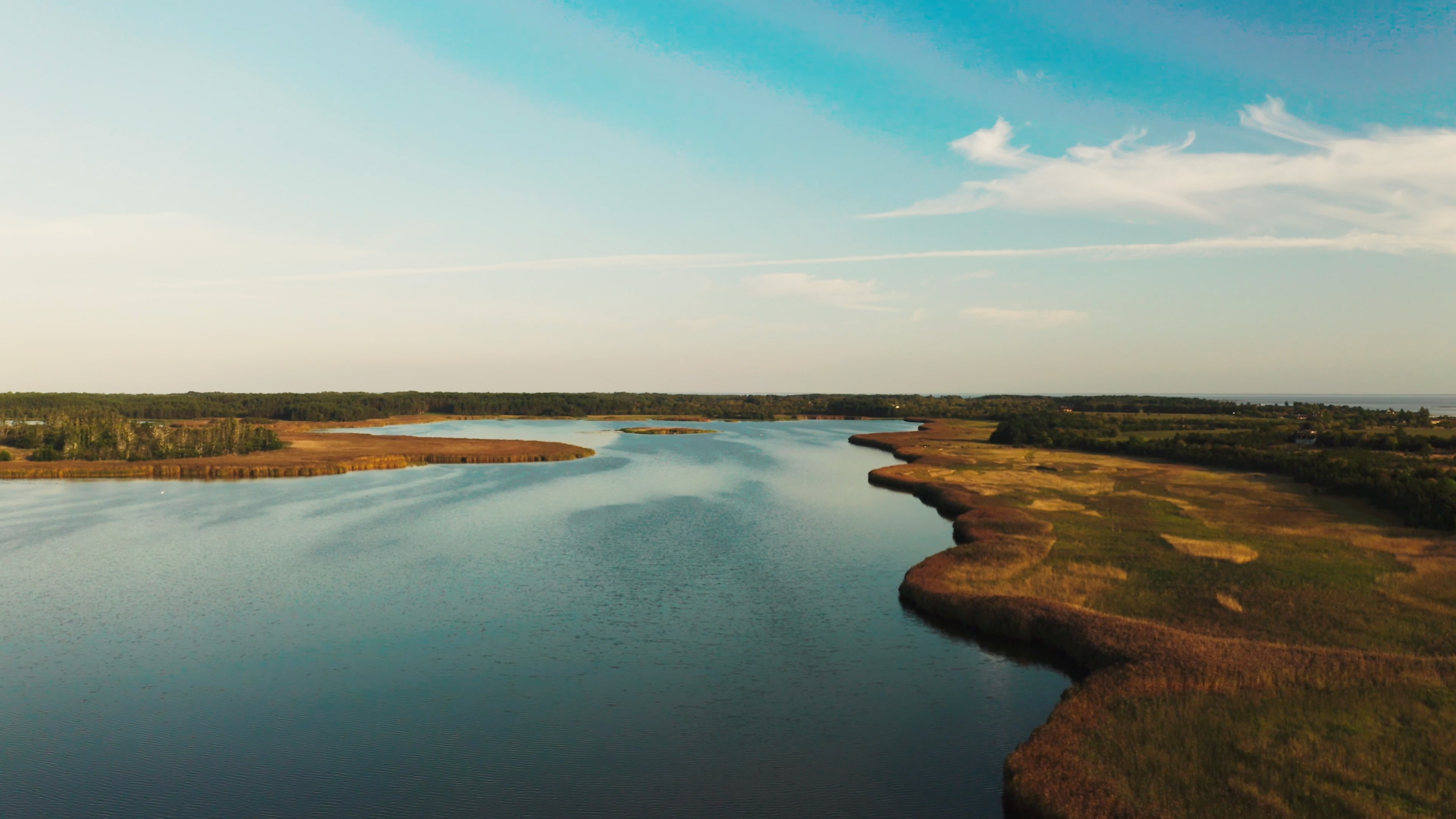
- Interactive map of Käina seamud deposit

Location
- Location: Hiiu County, Orjaku village, Estonia

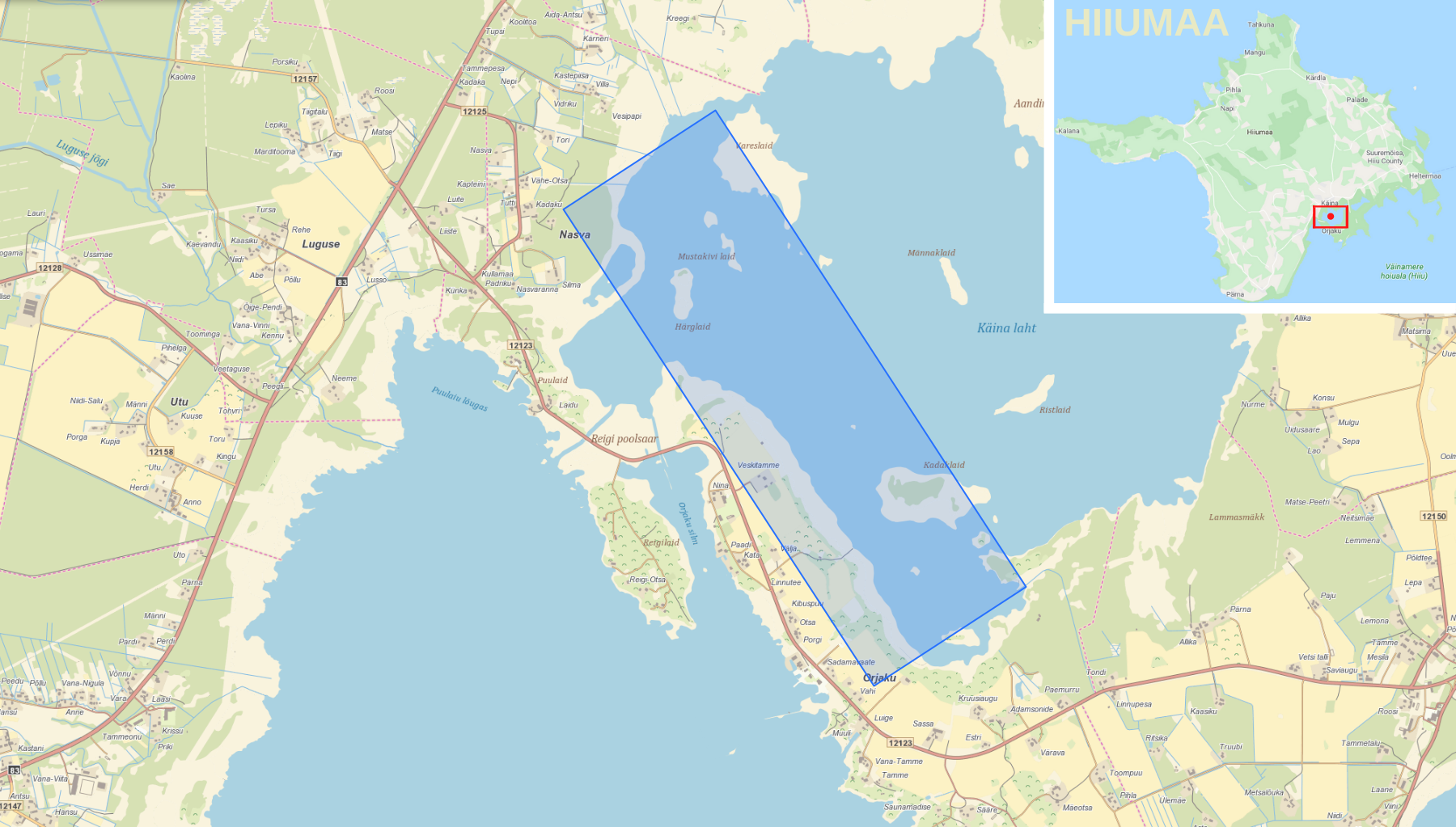
Käina seamud deposit area in Käina Bay

Käina seamud deposit (Estonian: Käina meremudamaardla) is a national mineral resource deposit in Estonia, Hiiu County, located in the western part of Käina Bay, Hiiumaa Island. In accordance to the Earth's Crust Act sea mud is a mineral resource in Estonia. Käina seamud deposit is one of 3 national seamud deposits in Estonia. The active reserve of the Käina seamud deposit in December, 2018 was 273,8 thousand tons and passive reserve 1 546,0 thousand tons.

== Studies ==
Several studies on geology and natural conditions have been implemented in Käina deposit. Radioactive studies were carried out in the first half of the 20th century. In 1922, M. Kand and F. Dreyer studied the radioactivity of the curative mud, which at that time was considered to be the main factor causing the therapeutic effect. The radioactivity of the mud in Käina Bay has measured 6.9 Mache units. In his monograph, published in 1947, Voldemar Vadi also mentions the radioactivity of fresh mud 6.9 Mache units and stood mud at 2.1 Mache units.

In 1957–1959, the Institute of Experimental and Clinical Medicine of the Academy of Sciences of the ESSR studied sea mud in Hiiumaa Island. Käina Bay mud was found to be the largest curative mud reserve in Hiiumaa, at the Bay's southern site mud deposit averaged several square kilometers forming a 0,5 - 1,0 meters thick deposit. In the 1960s, E.Türi determined the thickness of mud and analyzed it lithologically. In 1963, the Central Institute of Spa and Physiotherapy carried out complex researches on curative mud. In 1985, the ESSR Geology Administration conducted a comprehensive study for the purposes of determining curative mud reserves and quality in Käina Bay. The latest thorough studies date back to 1997 when the reserves in several curative mud deposits in Estonia were studied.

In 1998, the Geological Survey of Estonia prepared an investigation report by Kalle Suuroja and Ene Kadastik, which gives a short review of the mineral resources (sand, gravel, clay, limestone, curative mud, mineral water) of Hiiumaa Island (County) and the recommendation for economical using of these 28 sand and gravel, 6 clay, 6 limestone, 1 seamud and 1 mineral water deposits in the island. Deposits have been characterized in detail and the conception of economical use of mineral resources of Hiiumaa Island concluded that the reserves of the above-mentioned mineral resources meet the needs of Hiiumaa county as a small island. At the present extraction level the lasting of these resources of Hiiumaa Island is guaranteed for more than a hundred years.

== Composition ==
According to the study on curative mud in Estonia, carried out by the Centre of Excellence in Health Promotion and Rehabilitation (Estonian: Tervisedenduse ja Rehabilitatsiooni Kompetentsikeskus) in 2013–2014, on the basis of a low concentration of heavy metals, the sediments in Käina Bay can be considered the ecologically cleanest in Estonia. That is understandable, as the bay is located in the Käina Bay-Kassari Landscape Conservation Area, where a number of restrictions (for example, on the use of boat motors) have been imposed. The lithological composition of the mud was studied with thermogravimetric analysis (concentration of organics, mineral matter, and carbonates), and the ED-XRF method was used to determine the concentration of metals (Cu, Cr, Sr, Pb, Cd, Zn, Ni).

Käina Bay contains the most mineral sediments out of all five (Käina Bay, Haapsalu Tagalaht Bay, Värska Bay, Mullutu-Suurlaht Bay, and Ermistu lake) analyzed Estonian mineral mud deposits – on average, it contains 91.4% of minerals, 6.5% of organic matter, and 3.7% of carbonates. Within the same deposit, the composition of sediments is fairly similar. Outside the boundaries of the deposit, however, there is larger spatial variability. The lowest lead (Pb) concentrations among five deposits were detected in Käina Bay, where values do not exceed 20 ppm. In all points of the Käina Bay, the concentration of zinc (Zn) is within the norms – 80 ppm. Copper (Cu) is distinguished from all other heavy metals studied by not exceeding the target (100 ppm) in any of the researched deposits, but in Käina Bay, the concentration of Cu was the lowest – 9 ppm on average. In the case of the other studied heavy metals (Sr, Ni, Cr), in general, the lowest concentrations of heavy metals are in Käina Bay. It was determined that sediments are most mineral in Käina Bay (an average of 6.5% of organic matter of dry matter).

== Division ==
Käina seamud deposit consists of the active and passive reserves, which is divided into 6 blocks. Excavation of sea mud (peloid) is permitted only within the Orjaku limited management zone, which consists of Käina open cast mine and Käina II seamud open cast mine, covering three active blocks area.

Extraction permit area
Block	Size (hectares)	Amount (tons)	Depth (meters)	Type
First	4,93	86 796	1,2	Active
Second	6,2	60 986	0,7	Active
Third	11,28	126 000	0,8	Active
Fourth	0,35	2 000	0,4	Passive
Fifth	83,49	1 388 000	1,2	Passive
Sixth	28,2	156 000	0,4	Passive
