= Ruserahu =

Island in Estonia

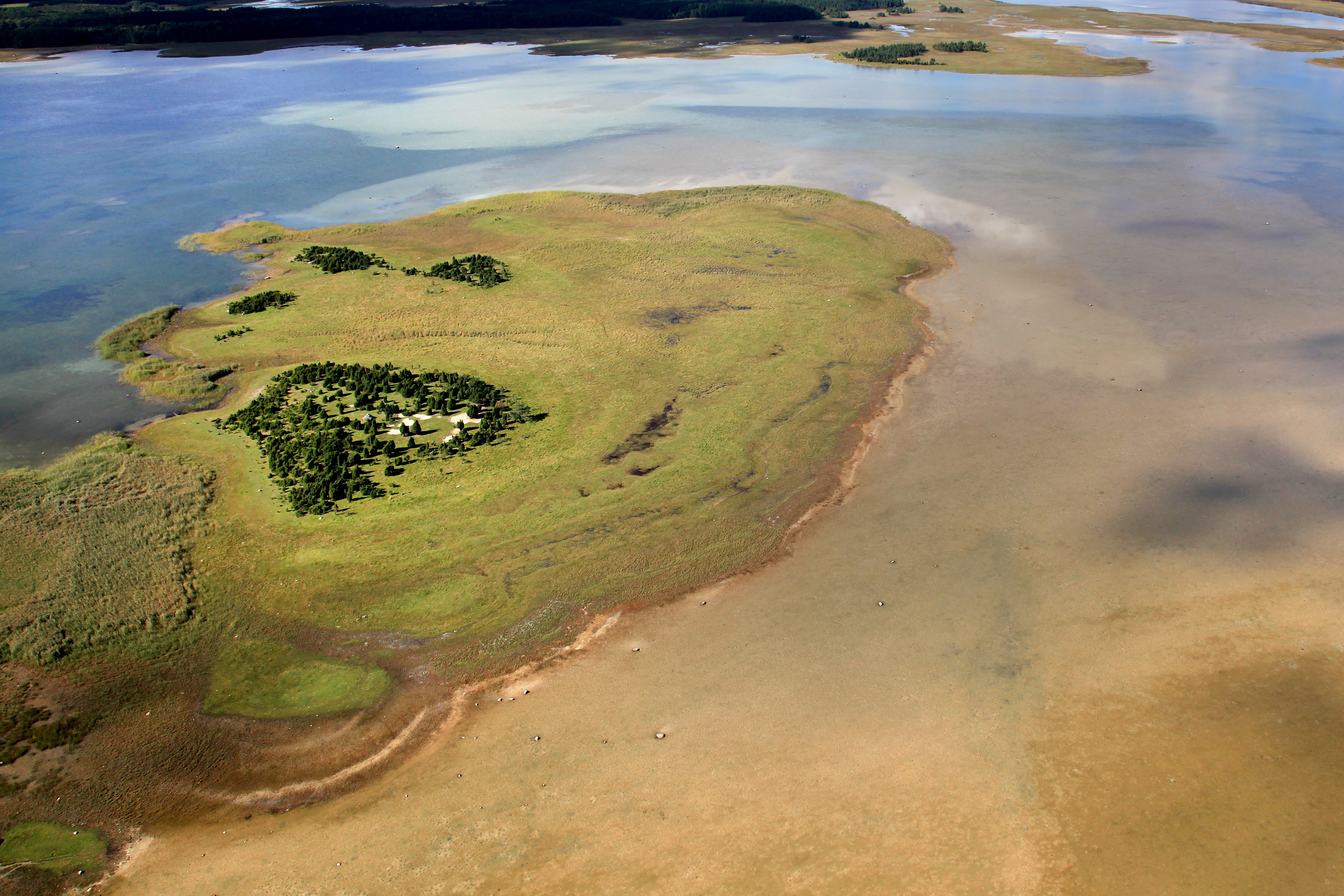
- Interactive map of Ruserahu

Geography
- Coordinates: 58°48′42″N 22°53′52″E
- Area: 3.1 ha (7.7 acres)

Administration
- Estonia
- County: Hiiu County
- Municipality: Hiiumaa Parish

Ruserahu is an uninhabited 31.1 hectares (77 acres) island belonging to Estonia. It is located in Õunaku Bay, 1.5 kilometers southwest of the Õunaku Peninsula, off the southeast coast of the larger island of Hiiumaa. The terrain on Ruserahu is very flat. The island's highest point is 2 meters above sea level. It stretches 0.4 kilometers in a north–south direction, and 0.45 kilometers in an east–west direction. Administratively, it belongs to the village of Esiküla on the island of Kassari, Hiiu Parish, Hiiu County. Ruserahu is part of the Käina Bay-Kassari Landscape Conservation Area.
