= Estonian curative mud =

Internationally, the terminology on curative mud (or therapeutic mud) is not uniform. According to the latest proposal for a new definition, by Gomes at al. (2013), a “peloid is a maturated mud or muddy dispersion with healing and/or cosmetic properties, composed of a complex mixture of fine-grained natural materials of geologic and/or biologic origins, mineral water or sea water, and commonly organic compounds from biological metabolic activity”. Peloid is often used only for the sea curative mud.

In Estonia, the curative mud considered as a sea and lake mud, which satisfies the following requirements of “Therapeutic mud and sand to the technological requirements approval” . In this context, the curative mud considered variable mixture of sea, lake or mineral water and organic and inorganic material produced by biological and geological action, applied topically as therapeutic agents.

In Estonia, as well as in the Baltic Sea Region and Russia, term "curative mud" is used for general description of

"peloid" – sea curative mud with organic matter >5% of dry matter and with grain size 0,1–1,0 mm maximum 3%;

"sapropel" – lake curative mud with organic matter >35% of dry matter and with grain size 0,1–1,0 mm maximum 2% and

"peat mud". The presence of grain-sized particles more than 1,0 mm in the curative mud is not permitted.

== Peat mud (balneological peat) ==
Peat mud is a type of curative mud formed from partially decomposed organic material accumulated in water-saturated wetland environments over thousands of years.

In Estonia and other Baltic countries, peat mud has traditionally been used in balneological and spa treatments due to its high organic matter content and heat-retaining properties.

Estonian balneological peat has been studied for its physicochemical composition, including humic and fulvic substances characteristic of balneological peat.

Estonia has the most significant resources for health and wellness tourism among the Baltic countries, including Scandinavia. In Estonia, natural remedies were commonly used during the first half of the 19th century, and frequently contained mud and sea-water. As a consequence, many Estonian spas have traditionally incorporated a combination of natural remedies with a range of physical therapies, including gentle exercise, massage and heat and water therapies.

Despite this, curative mud research in Estonia has stagnated since the 1990s, and one of the main limiting factors to the redevelopment of its public and commercial use is a lack of up-to-date scientific understanding about the sediment composition and depositional characteristics. In order to increase knowledge-intensive entrepreneurship in the fields of studying, developing and preserving local natural resources and the local population’s mobility and physical activity, a new body – the Centre of Excellence in Health Promotion and Rehabilitation (TERE CC) – was established in 2011, with the support of the European Regional Development Fund. The idea of this Centre is to bring about an innovation-based cooperation between representatives of physical and rehabilitation medicine clinics, research and development, local authorities and businesses in the field of balneology, particularly mud therapy.

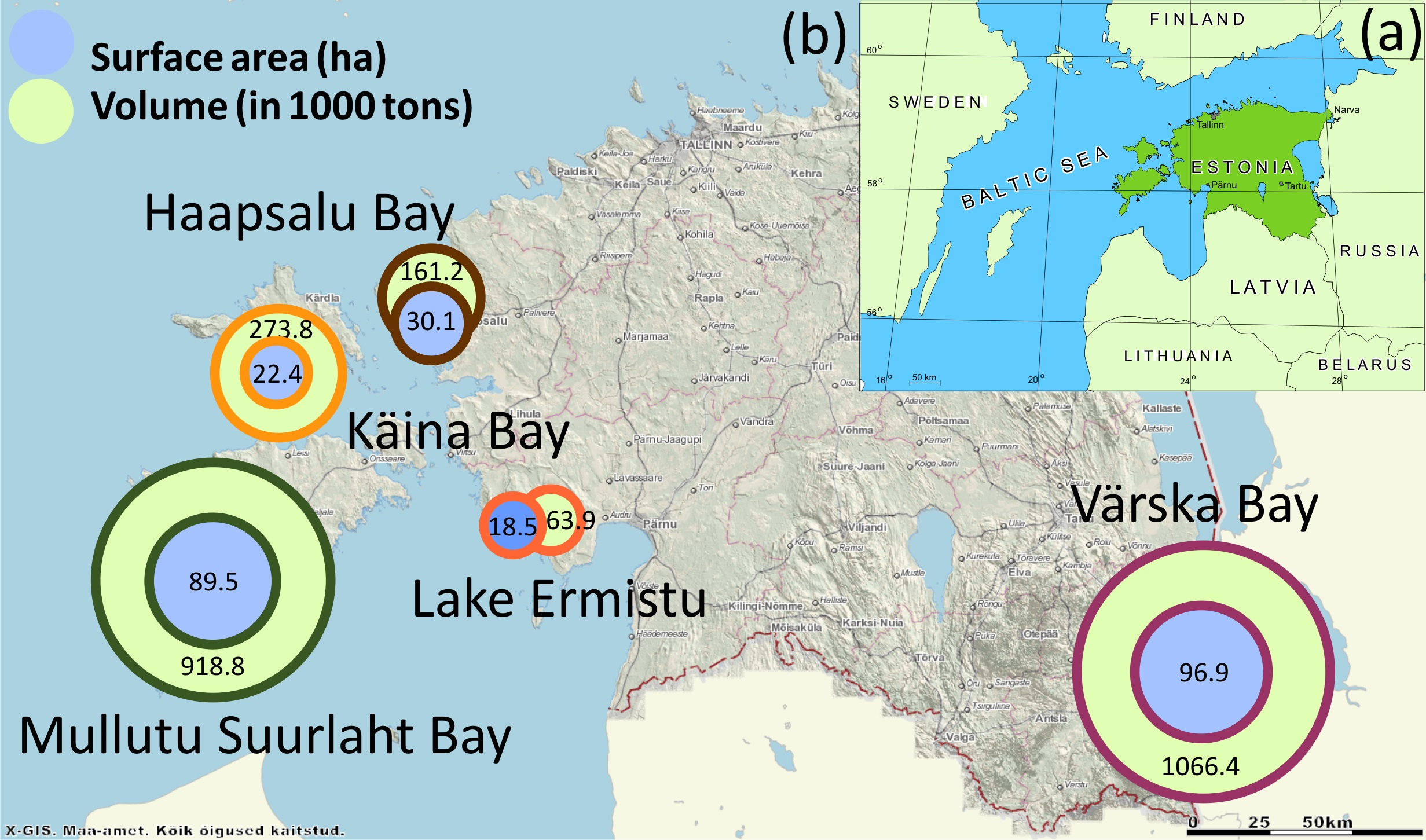
Estonian curative mud deposits in use: (a) regional position, (b) by surface area (ha) and deposits volume (in 1000 t)

Currently there are five deposits used for curative mud excavation in Estonia - Lake Ermistu, Haapsalu Tagalaht Bay, Mullutu Suurlaht Bay, Värska Bay and Käina Bay (Figure Estonian curative mud deposits in use).

The largest curative lake mud resource is in Värska Bay (1 066 400 t), the smallest in Lake Ermistu (63 900 t). The largest marine deposit is in Mullutu Suurlaht Bay (918 800 t), followed by Käina (273 800 t) and Haapsalu Tagalaht (161 200 t). In Estonia, over 600,000 t of curative mud has excavation permit. In the period from 2006 to 2018, the amount of extracted curative mud in Estonia was slightly over 7,000 tons
