= Ahelaid =

Island in Estonia

Coordinates: 58°44′N 23°09′E

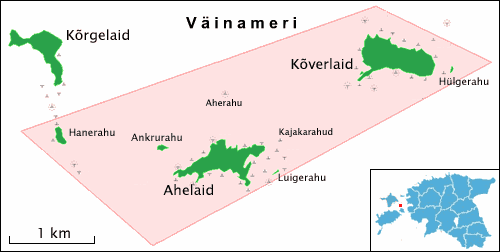
Ahelaid in Hiiumaa Islets Landscape Reserve's Laidelahe protection zone

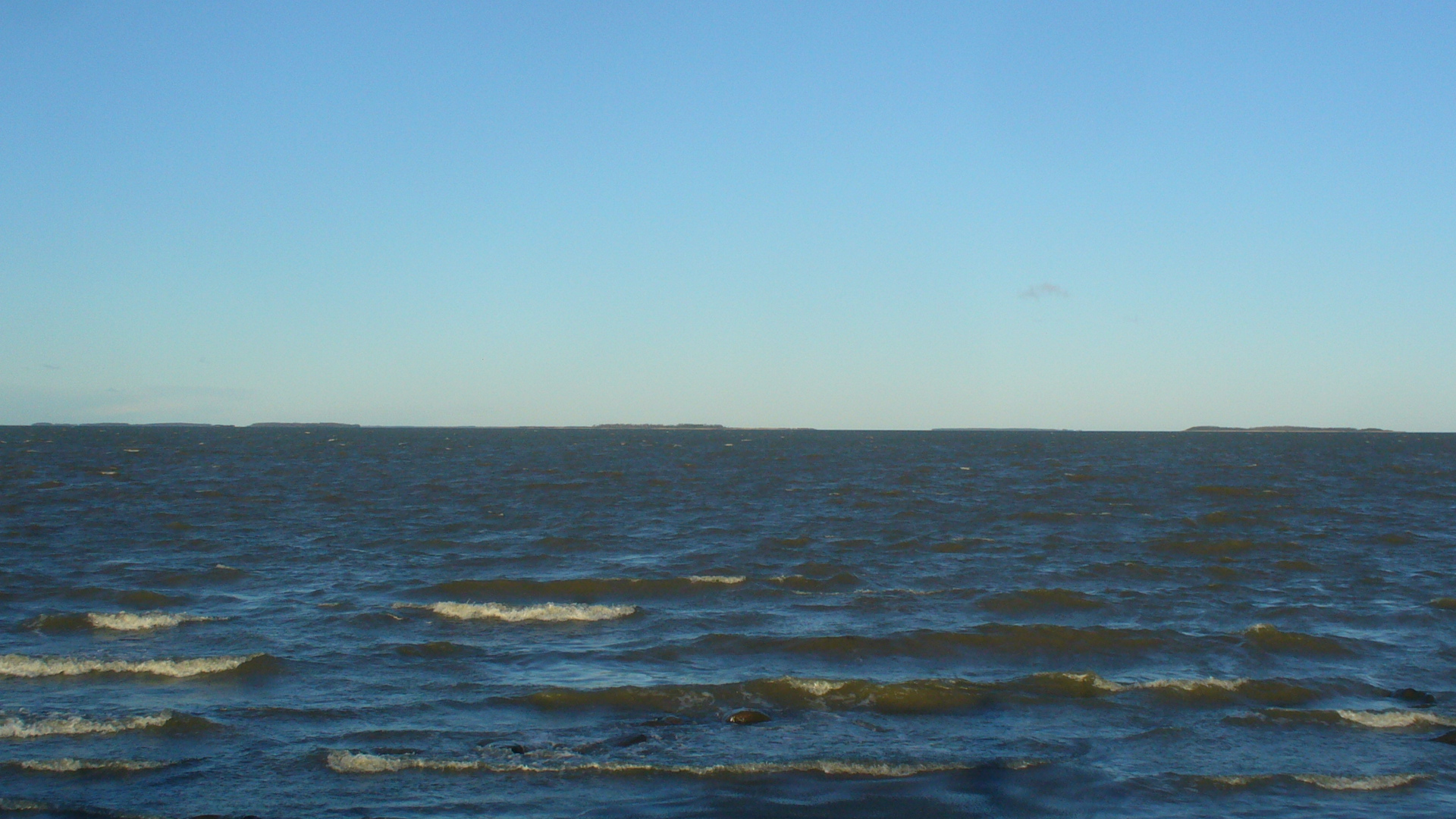
Hiiumaa islet from Muhu; from right to left: Kõverlaid, Heinlaid, Ahelaid, Kõrgelaid, Vareslaid, Hanerahu, Hanikatsi laid, Saarnaki laid, Moonsund

Ahelaid is a small uninhabited islet in Estonia. It lies in the Baltic Sea, south-east of Hiiumaa island. It has a surface area of 25 hectares. It is part of the Hiiumaa Islets Landscape Reserve.

Ahelaid lies 10.5 km from the Sarve Peninsula on Hiiumaa, 14 km from the Salinõmme peninsula on Hiiumaa and 6.5 km from Tammiski nukk on Muhu. Although it is closer to Muhu than to Hiiumaa, it is administered as part of Hiiu County. Near the island are some smaller islets: to the north, stony Aherahu; to the west Ankrurahu, which has some vegetation; to the east Luigerahu and to the northeast a few stone piles barely above the sea level called Kajakarahud.

The average height of the islet is below 2 meters and the highest point is 4.6 meters.

There are 45 bird species nesting on the islet annually, including sedge warbler (Acrocephalus schoenobaenus), Arctic tern (Sterna paradisaea) and whitethroat (Sylvia communis). All together 60 species of birds have been recorded.

The islet is also known as Hakilaid, probably from the common eider (Somateria mollissima) (Estonian: hahk).

There has been no habitation on the islet. People from both Muhu and Hiiumaa have gathered hay there in summer as until the end of the 19th century there was a shortage of land for hay. The islet may also have been used as pasture. There has been a fishermen's hut on the islet.
