= Laheküla, Saaremaa Parish =

Village in Estonia

Coordinates: 58°15′48″N 22°26′57″E

Laheküla
- Village
- Interactive map of Laheküla
- Country: Estonia
- County: Saare County
- Parish: Saaremaa Parish
- Time zone: UTC+2 (EET)
  - Summer (DST): UTC+3 (EEST)

Laheküla is a village in Saaremaa Parish, Saare County in western Estonia.

Suurlaht, the eastern part of Estonian fourth largest lake Mullutu-Suurlaht is located in the southwestern part of Laheküla village.

Before the administrative reform in 2017, the village was in Lääne-Saare Parish.

== See also ==
- Suurlaht
- Linnulaht
