= Luigerahu =

Island in Estonia

Coordinates: 58.7402°N 23.1457°E

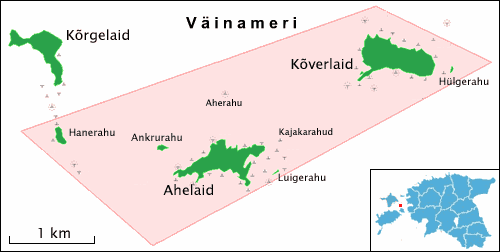
Map of the Laidelahe special protection zone of the Hiiumaa plateau landscape protection area Showing the Luigerahu Island

Luigerahu is a small, moraine-based Baltic Sea island that belongs to the country of Estonia.

Luigerahu covers approximately 0.2 hectares and lies half a kilometer off the western coast of the island of Ahelaid. The island is administered by Hiiu County, and along with a number of other islands, makes up the Hiiumaa Islets Landscape Reserve (Estonian: Hiiumaa laidude maastikukaitseala).

== See also ==
- List of islands of Estonia
