= Nasva (stream) =

River in Estonia

Coordinates: 58°12′59″N 22°23′45″E

Location
- Country: Estonia

Physical characteristics
- Source
  - location: Mullutu-Suurlaht
- Mouth
  - location: Suur Katel, Gulf of Riga
- Length: 3 km (1.9 mi)
- Basin size: 306 km^{2} (118 sq mi)

The Nasva is river in Estonia in Saare County. The river is 3 kilometres long. It runs from Mullutu-Suurlaht into Suur Katel in the Baltic Sea. The river is unique because its water flows in two directions. During the floods in spring, the water flows from the sea into the bay, the opposite of the usual direction of flow.
