= Hiiumaa Islets Landscape Conservation Area =

Protected area in Estonia

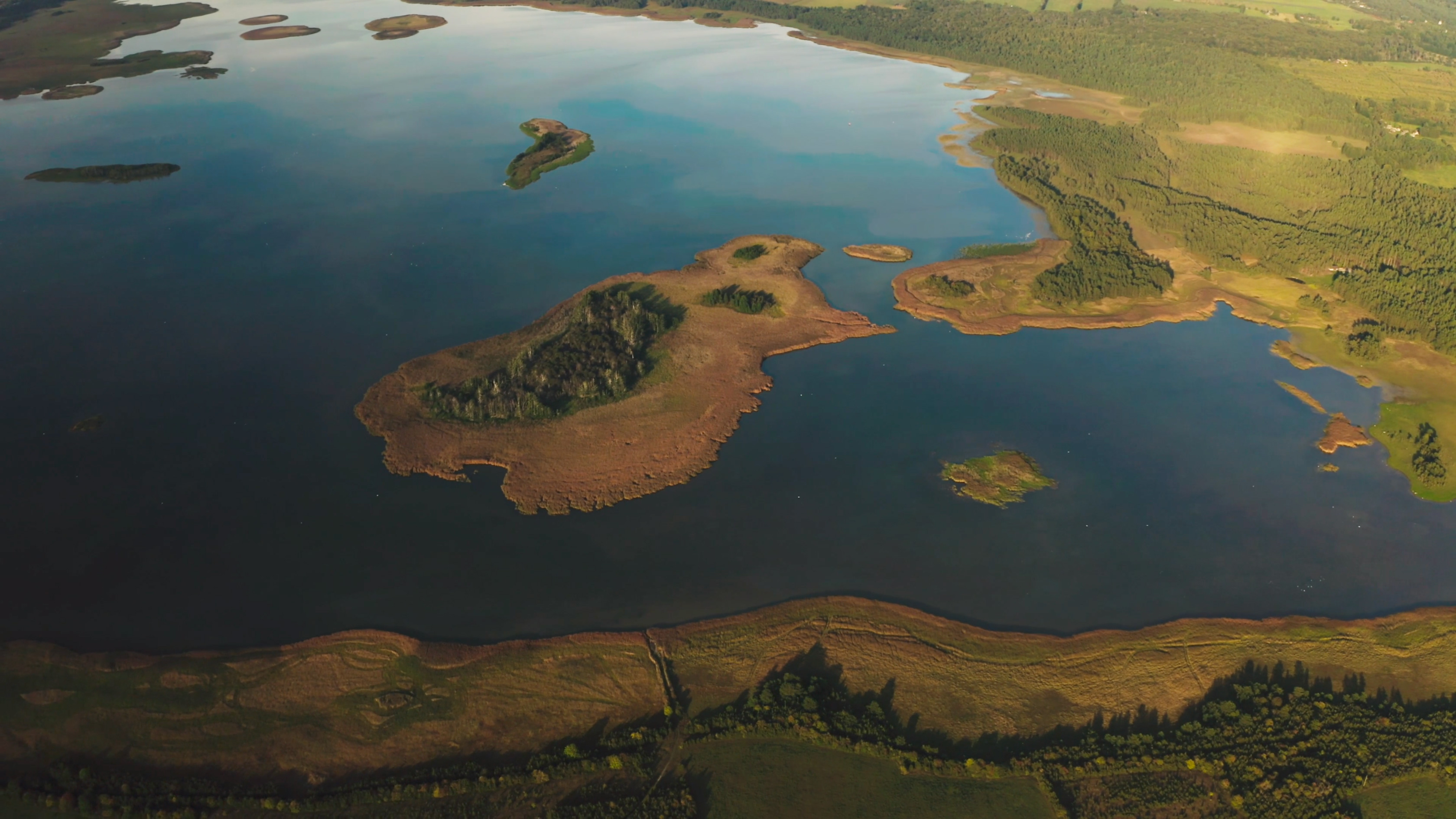

- Location within Estonia
- Location: Estonia
- Coordinates: 58°46′N 23°06′E
- Area: 17,700 ha (44,000 acres)

Ramsar Wetland
- Official name: Hiiumaa Islets and Käina Bay
- Designated: 1997
- Reference no.: 908

Hiiumaa Islets Landscape Conservation Area (Estonian: Hiiumaa laidude maastikukaitseala) is a protected area situated in Hiiu County, Estonia. Its area is 3224 ha.

With Käina Bay, there is designated a Ramsar site called Hiiumaa Islets and Käina Bay. The area of this Ramsar site is 17,000 ha.
