= Orjaku =

Village in Estonia

- Village
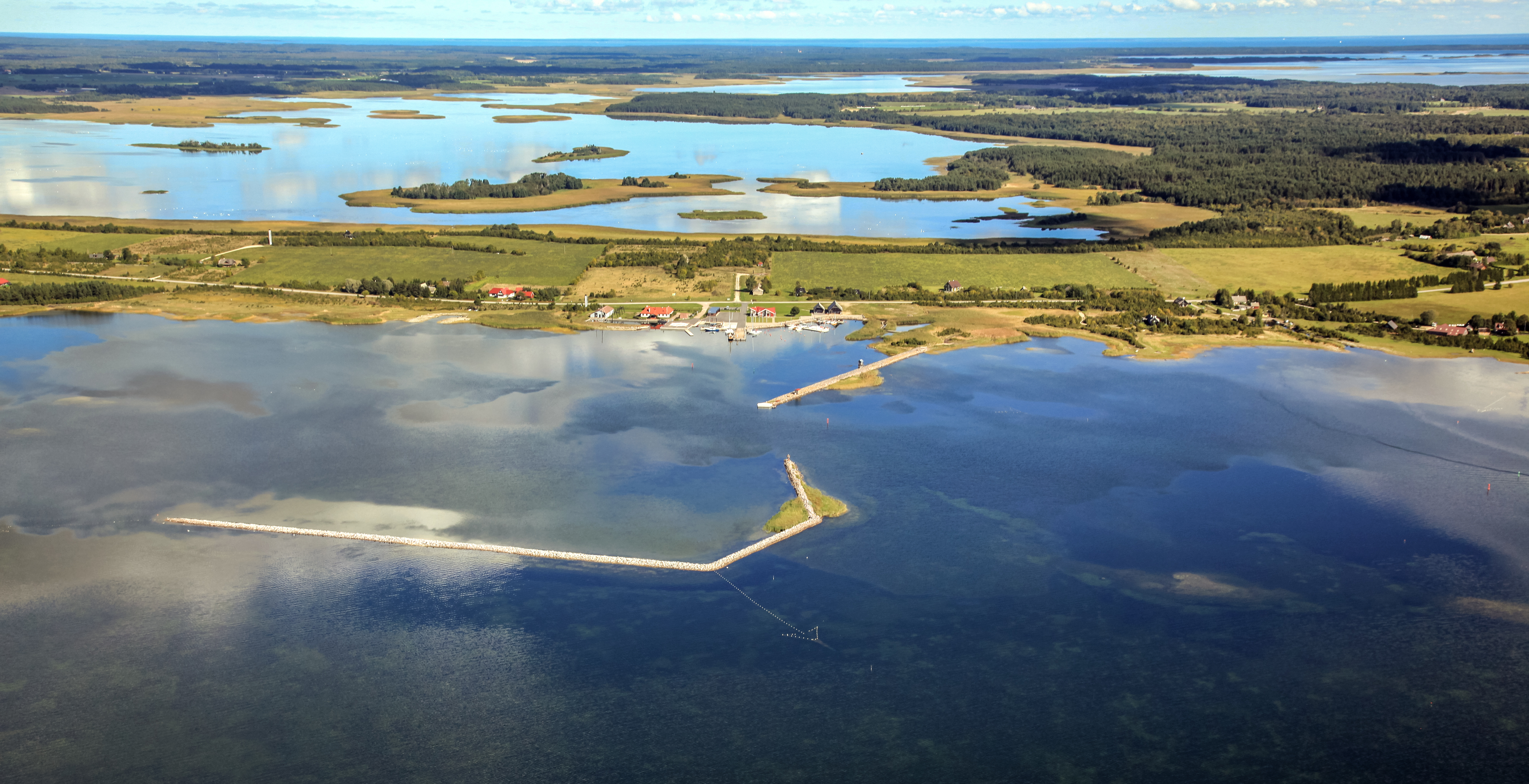
- Orjaku harbour and Kassari

- Location within Estonia
- Coordinates: 58°48′N 22°47′E
- Country: Estonia
- County: Hiiu County
- Parish: Hiiumaa Parish
- Time zone: UTC+2 (EET)
  - Summer (DST): UTC+3 (EEST)

Orjaku is a village in Hiiumaa Parish, Hiiu County in northwestern Estonia.

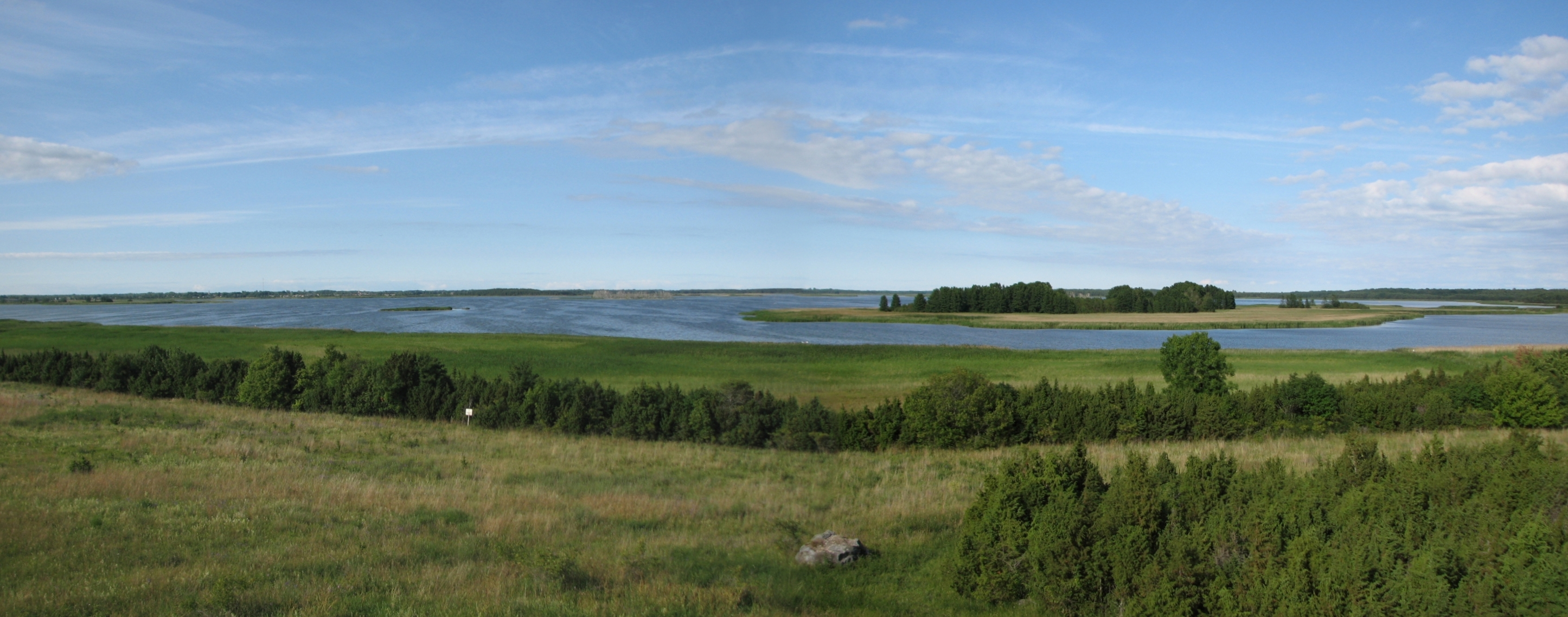
View of Käina Bay from Orjaku bird watching tower

Orjaku is one of the oldest names in the island of Hiiumaa. It was first mentioned 1254 as Oryocko, Oriwocko.

As of 2019, there are 101 people living in the village.
