= Käina Bay-Kassari Landscape Conservation Area =

Protected area in Estonia

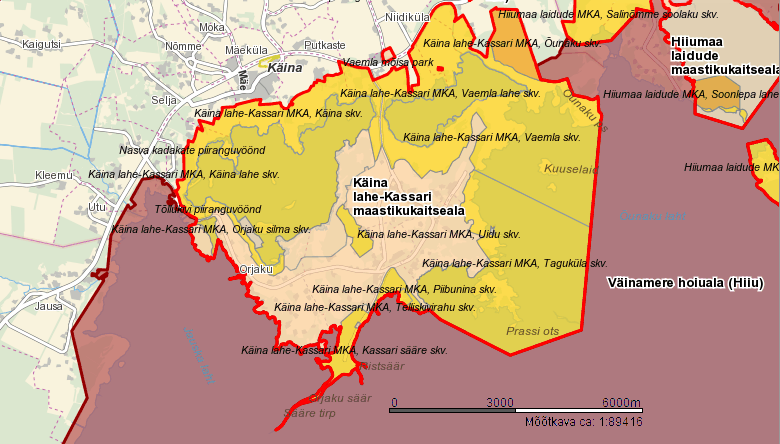

- Location within Estonia
- Location: Estonia
- Coordinates: 58°49′N 22°53′E
- Area: 5,681 ha (14,040 acres)
- Established: 1962 (1998)

Käina Bay-Kassari Landscape Conservation Area is a nature park situated in Hiiu County, Estonia.

Its area is 5,681 ha.

The protected area was designated in 1962 to protect Käina Bay and the island of Kassari semi-natural communities. In 1998, the protected area was redesignated to the landscape conservation area.
