= Mullutu-Suurlaht =

Lake in Estonia

- Location within Estonia
- Location: Lääne-Saare Parish, Saare County
- Coordinates: 58°14′45″N 22°22′45″E
- Primary inflows: Kaarmise, Kärla, Unimäe River
- Primary outflows: Nasva River
- Surface area: 1,440 ha (3,600 acres)
- Average depth: 1.0 m (3.3 ft)
- Max. depth: 2.1 m (6.9 ft)
- Settlements: Kuressaare

Mullutu-Suurlaht (also Mullutu Suurlaht) is a former lake in Estonia. It is located on the island of Saaremaa, about 2 kilometres (1.2 mi) west of the town of Kuressaare. It had an area of 1,440 ha (3,600 acres) and its maximum depth was 2.1 metres (6.9 ft). It was a brackish waterbody that has now become two separate lakes as a result of uplift and overgrowth:

- Suurlaht or Kellamäe Bay (Estonian: Kellamäe laht; 531 ha or 1,310 acres) to the east, and
- Mullutu Bay (Estonian: Mullutu laht) or Big Mullutu Bay (Estonian: Suur Mullutu laht; 412.4 ha or 1,019 acres) to the west.

During regular flooding in spring (the usual rise is 0.75 metres or 2 feet 6 inches, maximum 1.16 m or 3 ft 10 in), the two lakes can merge with nearby Paadla, Vägara, and Kaalupea bays to create a temporary waterbody covering up to 3,600 ha (8,900 acres). Suurlaht drains into Mullutu Bay via Kurgu Creek, and Mullutu Bay is drained by the 3 km (1.9 mi) Nasva River. Due to a strong connection with the sea through the Nasva River, the lakes are rich in fish. The main species include bleak, burbot, crucian carp, dace, eel, gudgeon, ide, perch, pike, ruffe, roach, rudd, and tench.

== See also ==
- List of lakes of Estonia
