= Kassari =

Island in Estonia

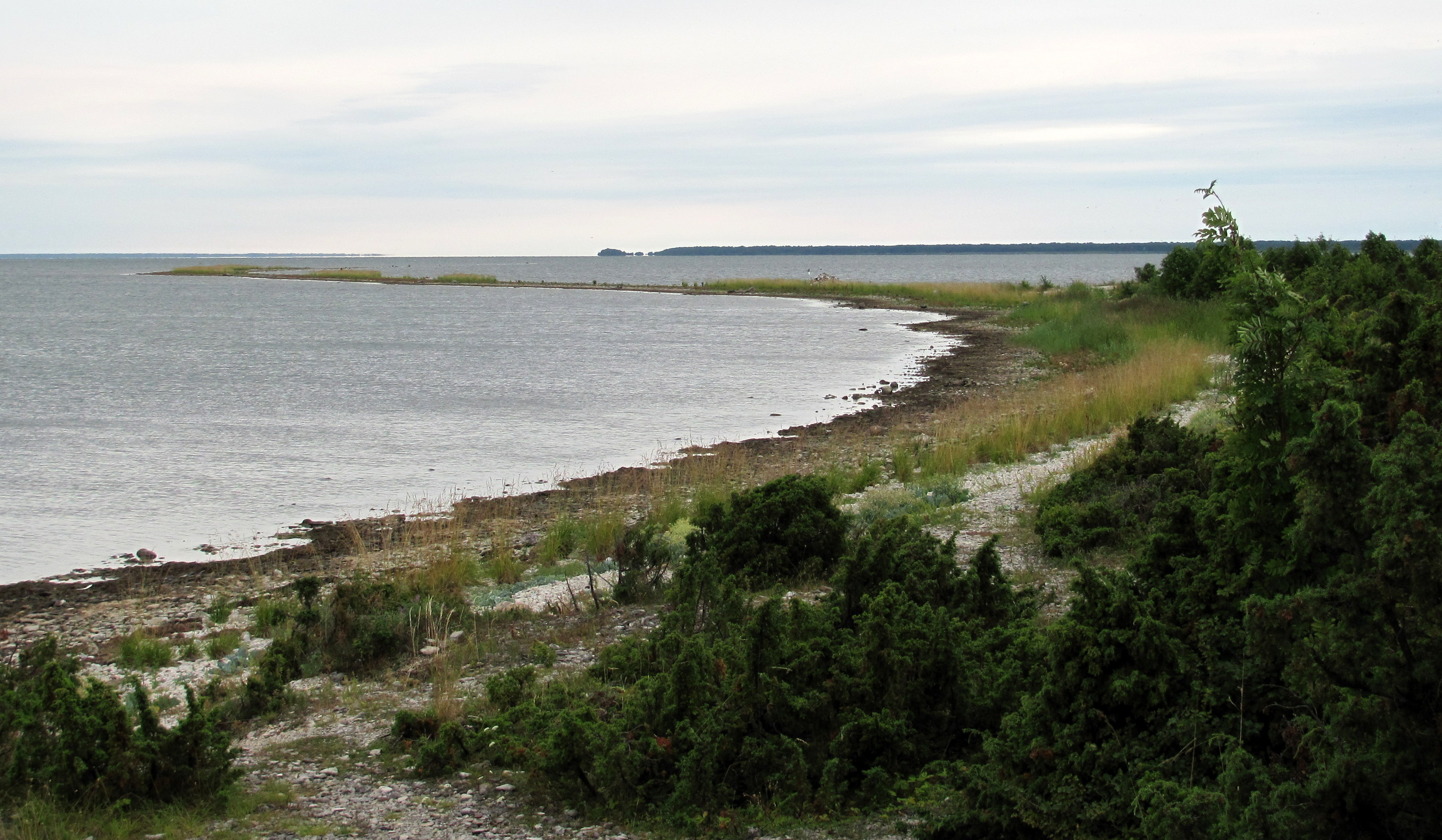
- Beach of Kassari

- Location within Estonia

Geography
- Coordinates: 58°48′00″N 22°50′00″E
- Area: 19.3 km^{2} (7.5 sq mi)

Administration
- Estonia
- County: Hiiu County

Kassari is an Estonian island. It has an area of 19.3 km^{2} with a population of around 300. It has a museum dedicated to Oskar Kallas and Aino Kallas.

The philosopher and pedagogue Ülo Kaevats (1947–2015) was born on Kassari.

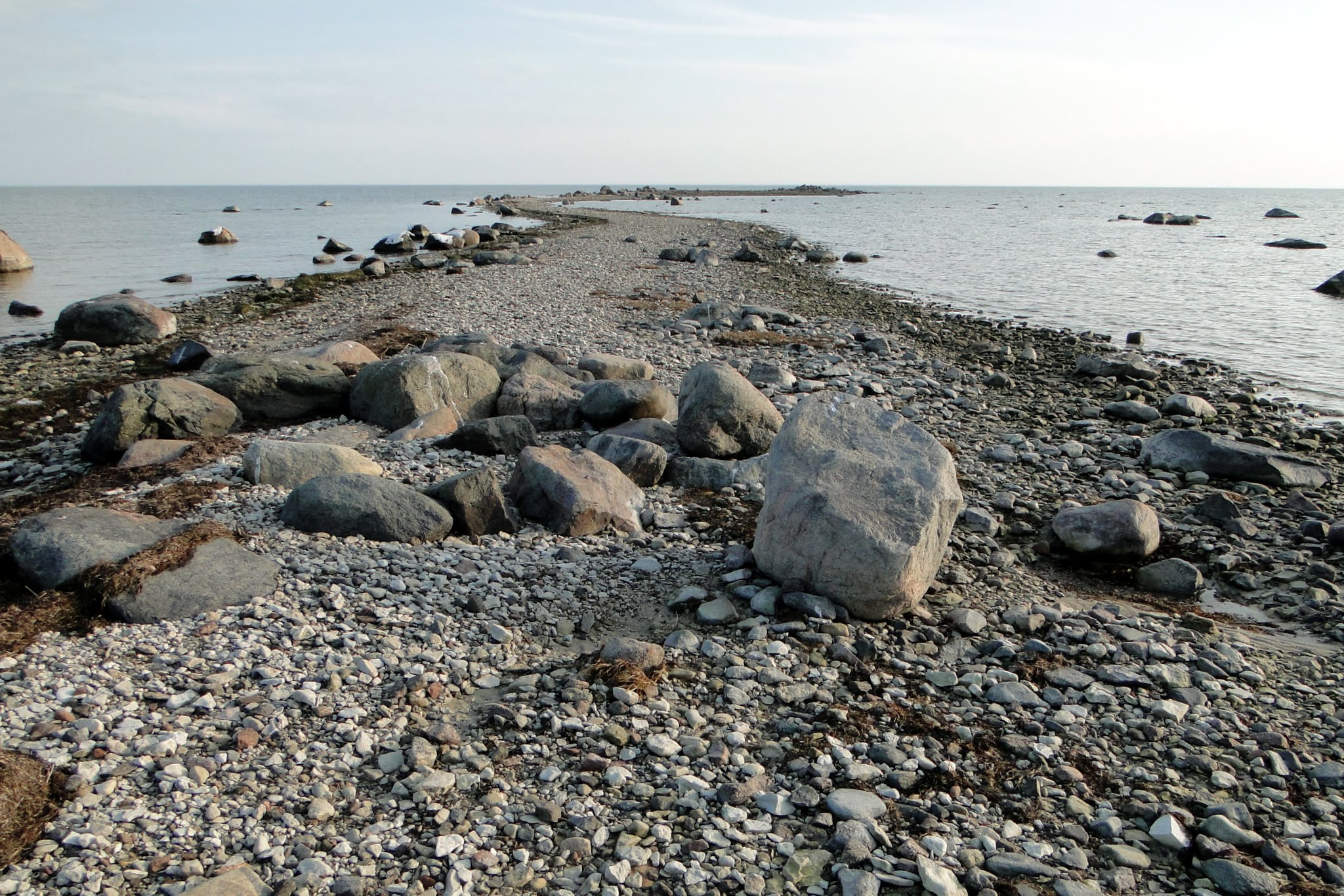
The tongue of land in Kassari

== Name ==
Kassari is first mentioned in the year 1520 as Cassar und Kakar. In 1564 it was being called Kaskesara, Kasaßari Hollma and Kasksarske Wacke (1688), Cassari Holma (1709) and in 1770, Kassaro and Kassar.

Linguists Carl Friedrich Wilhelm Russwurm, Paul Ariste and Lauri Kettunen have all come to the conclusion, that the name of the island has come from the words birch (kask) and island (saar).

== See also ==
- List of islands of Estonia
