= List of churches in Estonia =

This is the List of churches in Estonia. It aims to include all current churches, chapels and monasteries in the current territory of Estonia, as well as former Christian sacral buildings that were specially designed for that purpose. The list may not include all smaller chapels located within churchyards and cemeteries, as well as regular buildings formerly used by a congregation. Note that the "Year" here denotes the year that the construction of the church began or finished, when it was inaugurated, or the main construction period of the church in question.

In line with the common church naming traditions in Estonia, a traditionally Lutheran country, the Lutheran parish churches are usually listed by their locality name (e.g. "Aegviidu Church"), while churches of other denominations are listed either by their full name by their common name. If a locality has several Lutheran churches, the official names are given.

== Churches in Estonia ==
=== Harju County ===
Name	Denomination	Year	Location	Image	Notes	Refs
Aegviidu Church	Lutheran	1895	Aegviidu; 59°17′23″N 25°36′13″E		Dedicated to St. Alexander	
Aruküla Trinity Church	Disused, in ruins (formerly Estonian Orthodox)	1873	Kulli, near Aruküla; 59°22′05″N 25°01′36″E		Dedicated to the doctrine of the Trinity. Burned after a Soviet bombing strike during the Tallinn offensive in 1944 and was in ruins. Reopened in 2023.	
Harju-Jaani Church	Lutheran	1860–1863	Raasiku; 59°22′28″N 25°11′21″E		Dedicated to St. John the Baptist	
Harju-Madise Church	Lutheran	13th century	Madise; 59°17′24″N 24°07′22″E		Dedicated to Saint Matthias, who has also given name to the Madise village. There is a chapel located within the churchyard, from the 19th century.	
Harju-Risti Church	Lutheran	c. 1330	Harju-Risti; 59°13′50″N 23°59′57″E		Named after the True Cross which has also given name to the Harju-Risti village. Also known simply as "Risti Church"; Contains the oldest church bell in Estonia.	
Harju-Risti Orthodox Church	Demolished (formerly Estonian Orthodox)	1892	Harju-Risti; 59°13′40″N 24°00′50″E		Was damaged in fires in the 1950s and was demolished during the Soviet occupation in 1961.	
Harkujärve Community Church	Lutheran	1994	Harkujärve; 59°24′58″N 24°36′06″E		Chapel of ease of Tallinn Bethel Church	
Jõelähtme Church	Lutheran	First third of 14th century	Jõelähtme; 59°26′45″N 25°07′27″E		Dedicated to Blessed Virgin Mary; There is a chapel located within the churchyard, from either the 17th or the 18th century.	
Jüri Church	Lutheran	1884	Jüri; 59°21′35″N 24°55′22″E		Dedicated to St George, who has also given name to the small borough of Jüri. There are two chapels located within Jüri churchyard, both from the 19th century.	
Kehra Oratory	Baptist		Kehra; 59°20′06″N 25°20′11″E			
Keila Church	Lutheran	c. 1280	Keila; 59°18′28″N 24°25′46″E		Dedicated to St. Michael the Archangel; There are six chapels located within Keila churchyard, two from the turn of the 18th to the 19th century, two from the 19th century and two from the 2nd half of the 19th century.	
Keila Baptist Church	Baptist		Keila; 59°18′27″N 24°24′50″E			
Keila Methodist Oratory	Methodist		Keila; 59°18′36″N 24°25′17″E			
Keila New Apostolic Church	New Apostolic	1994	Keila; 59°18′32″N 24°25′00″E			
Kolga Convent	Demolished (formerly Catholic)	14th–15th century	Kolga; 59°29′25″N 25°36′22″E		Former convent of the Cistercian Roma Abbey of Gotland, Sweden. Fell into ruins during the Polish–Swedish War of 1600–1611.	
Kose Church	Lutheran	c. 1370	Kose; 59°11′17″N 25°10′01″E		Dedicated to St. Nicholas; There are two chapels located within Kose churchyard, from the 18th century and from 1898.	
Kose-Uuemõisa Manor Chapel	Disused (formerly Lutheran)	1886	Kose-Uuemõisa; 59°12′26″N 25°05′36″E			
Kuusalu Church	Lutheran	Late 13th century	Kuusalu; 59°26′42″N 25°26′12″E		Dedicated to St. Lawrence of Rome; There is a chapel located within Kuusalu churchyard, from the 19th century.	
Kuusalu Moravian Oratory	Moravian	1935	Kuusalu; 59°26′37″N 25°26′38″E			
Leesi Church	Lutheran	1867	Leesi; 59°36′29″N 25°30′08″E		Dedicated to St. Catherine of Alexandria	
Loksa Church	Lutheran	1847–1853	Loksa; 59°34′31″N 25°43′29″E		Dedicated to Blessed Virgin Mary	
Loksa Baptist Oratory	Baptist		Loksa; 59°34′33″N 25°43′14″E			
Loksa Church of the Righteous Saint John of Kronstadt	Russian Orthodox	2003	Loksa; 59°35′09″N 25°43′24″E		Dedicated to the Righteous Saint John of Kronstadt	
Maardu Church of St. Michael the Archangel	Russian Orthodox	1998	Maardu; 59°29′07″N 25°01′15″E		Dedicated to St. Michael the Archangel	
Chapel of the Seafarers Centre at the Muuga Harbour	Nondenominational	1998	Maardu; 59°28′54″N 24°58′02″E		Serves the seafarers at the Muuga Harbour.	
Nabala Moravian Oratory	Moravian	1926	Paekna, near Nabala; 59°16′05″N 24°50′11″E			
Naissaar Church	Lutheran	1934	Lõunaküla / Storbyn, Naissaar Island; 59°32′25″N 24°31′46″E		Dedicated to St. Mary, mother of Jesus	
Nissi Church	Lutheran	1871–1873	Riisipere, now containing Nissi; 59°06′14″N 24°18′34″E		Dedicated to St. Mary, mother of Jesus; There is a chapel located within the churchyard, from the 2nd half of the 19th century.	
Nissi Oratory	Moravian	1893	Riisipere, now containing Nissi; 59°06′21″N 24°19′10″E			
Padise Abbey	Disused, in ruins (formerly Catholic)	1317–1448	Riisipere, now containing Nissi; 59°13′39″N 24°08′27″E		Former abbey of the Cistercian Order. Was closed in 1559 during the Livonian War and fell into ruins partially during the war and by a fire in 1766. The ruins are accessible as a museum.	
Paldiski St. Nicholas' Church	Lutheran	1841	Paldiski; 59°21′03″N 24°03′09″E		Dedicated to St. Nicholas	
Paldiski Pentecostal Church	Pentecostal		Paldiski; 59°21′02″N 24°03′26″E			
Paldiski St. George's Church	Estonian Orthodox	1784–1787	Paldiski; 59°20′57″N 24°03′17″E		Dedicated to Saint George	
Paldiski Church of St. Panteleimon the Great Martyr	Russian Orthodox	2003	Paldiski; 59°21′15″N 24°03′07″E		Dedicated to Saint Pantaleon	
Paldiski Church of the Pious St. Sergius of Radonezh	Russian Orthodox	2015	Paldiski; 59°21′11″N 24°03′35″E		Dedicated to the Pious St. Sergius of Radonezh	
Suur-Pakri Church	Disused (formerly Lutheran)	1890	Suur-Pakri Island, Paldiski; 59°18′21″N 23°56′02″E		Dedicated to St. Olaf II of Norway; Fell into disrepair during the Soviet occupation as the Pakri Islands were governed by the Soviet military. Partly restored in the 21st century.	
Väike-Pakri Church	Disused, in ruins (formerly Lutheran)	1825	Väike-Pakri Island, Paldiski; 59°19′44″N 24°00′20″E		Dedicated to St. Olaf II of Norway; Fell into disrepair during the Soviet occupation as the Pakri Islands were governed by the Soviet military. Only the bell tower survives.	
Pikva St. Michael's Chapel	Lutheran	end of the 19th century	Pikva; 59°16′55″N 25°22′21″E		Dedicated to St. Michael the Archangel; Chapel of ease of Kose Church	
Prangli Church	Lutheran	1848	Lääneotsa, Prangli Island; 59°37′09″N 24°59′57″E		Dedicated to St. Lawrence of Rome	
Rannamõisa Church	Lutheran	1901	Rannamõisa; 59°26′19″N 24°30′03″E		Also known as the "Ranna Church", literally meaning "the Beach Church", as named after its location in the Rannamõisa village, which means "Beach Manor" in Estonian.	
Randvere Church	Lutheran	1852	Randvere; 59°30′15″N 24°54′30″E		Dedicated to Saint Peter	
Rohuneeme Chapel	Lutheran	2007	Rohuneeme; 59°33′31″N 24°48′27″E		Chapel of ease of Viimsi St. Jacob's Church	
Saha Chapel	Disused (formerly Lutheran)	c. 1220	Saha; 59°25′15″N 24°58′57″E		Dedicated to St. Nicholas; Fell into disrepair during the Great Northern War.	
Saku Borough Oratory	Moravian	1922	Saku; 59°18′10″N 24°40′10″E		Dedicated to St. Thomas the Apostle	
Tallinn St. Mary's Cathedral	Lutheran	1430s	Tallinn; 59°26′13″N 24°44′21″E		Dedicated to Blessed Virgin Mary; Also known as the "Dome Church" (Toomkirik) or the "Episcopal Dome Church" (Piiskoplik Toomkirik), after the German word for "cathedral" (Dom). Seat of the Archbishop of Tallinn, the primate of the Estonian Evangelical Lutheran Church	
Tallinn Chapel of the Consistory of the Estonian Evangelical Lutheran Church	Lutheran	17th century	Tallinn; 59°26′12″N 24°44′21″E			
Tallinn Church of the Holy Spirit	Lutheran	1380	Tallinn; 59°26′17″N 24°44′45″E		Dedicated to the Holy Spirit	
Tallinn St. Michael's Swedish Church	Lutheran	1531	Tallinn; 59°26′06″N 24°44′32″E		Dedicated to St. Michael the Archangel	
Tallinn Charles' Church	Lutheran	1870	Tallinn; 59°25′54″N 24°44′20″E		Officially the "Tallinn Toompea Charles' Church" as it lies in the historical precinct of Toompea. Dedicated to Charles XI of Sweden. The first wooden Charles' Church was built in 1670 on the former site of the St. Anthony's Chapel nearby. It was burned down for strategic purposes by the defending Swedes during the Great Northern War in 1710. In 1863, the Temporary Charles' Church was built at another nearby site to serve during the construction of the current Charles' Church. It is one of only two churches in Estonia with two spires.	
Tallinn St. John's Church	Lutheran	1867	Tallinn; 59°26′01″N 24°44′44″E		Dedicated to St. John the Evangelist	
Tallinn Bethel Church	Lutheran	1938	Tallinn; 59°26′15″N 24°42′46″E		Named after Bethel, a Biblical Israelite town in the modern West Bank, Palestine	
Chapel of the Old Charles' Cemetery	Lutheran	1893	Tallinn; 59°25′28″N 24°45′59″E		Chapel of ease of the Tallinn Charles' Church; the chapel is a miniature version of the church and therefore one of the few religious buildings in Estonia with two towers. Also functions as the cemetery gate.	
Tallinn St. Nicholas' Church	Disused (formerly Lutheran)	1420	Tallinn; 59°26′09″N 24°44′33″E		Dedicated to St. Nicholas. Distinguished from the other St. Nicholas' churches in Tallinn in Estonian by usage of the Estonian name "Nigul". Was badly damaged during the March Bombing of 1944. Now houses the ecclesiastical art department of the Art Museum of Estonia.	
Tallinn St. Barbara's Chapel	Demolished (formerly Lutheran)	Early 14th century	Tallinn; 59°25′56″N 24°44′34″E		Dedicated to St. Barbara. Was later also called the "St. Barbara's Church". The church was demolished ca. 1535	
Tallinn St. Gertrude's Church	Demolished (formerly Lutheran)	1544	Tallinn; 59°26′37″N 24°44′51″E		Dedicated to St. Gertrude of Nivelles. The first St. Gertrude's Chapel was built at the site in 1438–1450 and demolished in 1535. The church was built in 1544 and was burnt down for strategic reasons during the 1571 Siege of Tallinn during the Livonian War.	
Temporary Charles' Church	Demolished (formerly Lutheran)	1863	Tallinn; 59°25′52″N 24°44′23″E		Dedicated to Charles XI of Sweden. The first wooden Charles' Church was built in 1670 on the former site of the St. Anthony's Chapel nearby. It was burned down for strategic purposes by the defending Swedes during the Great Northern War in 1710. In 1863, the Temporary Charles' Church was built to serve during the construction of the current Charles' Church nearby. The Temporary Charles' Church was demolished upon its completion in 1870.	
Tallinn Adventist Church	Seventh-day Adventist	1923	Tallinn; 59°26′17″N 24°45′10″E			
Tallinn St. Olaf's Church	Baptist (formerly Lutheran)	14th century	Tallinn; 59°26′29″N 24°44′52″E		Dedicated to St. Olaf II of Norway. The church was ceded to Baptists during the Soviet occupation of Estonia in 1950.	
Tallinn Kalju Baptist Congregation Church	Baptist	1902	Tallinn; 59°26′46″N 24°44′09″E		Also called an oratory. Named after its location on Kalju Street.	
Tallinn Methodist Church	Methodist	2000	Tallinn; 59°26′23″N 24°46′33″E		Seat of the superintendent of the Estonian Methodist Church.	
Tallinn Veerenni Church	Demolished (formerly Evangelical, thereafter Methodist)	1909	Tallinn; 59°25′37″N 24°44′48″E		Burned down in the March Bombing of 1944.	
Tallinn Estonian Christian Pentecostal Church Headquarters	Pentecostal	1908	Tallinn; 59°26′03″N 24°44′23″E		Headquarters of the Estonian Christian Pentecostal Church	
Tallinn Endla Moravian Oratory	Moravian		Tallinn; 59°25′41″N 24°42′53″E		Named after its location on Endla Street.	
Tallinn Pentecostal Congregation Elim	Pentecostal	1930	Tallinn; 59°25′36″N 24°44′54″E		Named after Elim, a Biblical location where the Israelites camped following their Exodus from Egypt.	
Tallinn St. Peter and St. Paul's Cathedral	Catholic	1844	Tallinn; 59°26′17″N 24°44′56″E		Dedicated to the apostles St. Peter and St. Paul. Seat of the Apostolic Administrator, the primate of the Catholic Church in Estonia.	
Tallinn Chapel of the St. Catherine's Monastery	Catholic	13th century	Tallinn; 59°26′17″N 24°44′58″E		Officially the "Chapel of the St. Catherine's Monastery of the Dominican Order". Dedicated to St. Catherine of Siena. The main church, St. Catherine's Church, is disused.	
Tallinn Missionaries of Charity Monastery	Catholic		Tallinn; 59°26′25″N 24°42′55″E		Monastery of the Missionaries of Charity.	
Tallinn Three Handed Mother of God Church	Catholic (Ukrainian Greek Catholic)	Medieval	Tallinn; 59°26′29″N 24°44′45″E		Dedicated to the Mother of God (Mary, mother of Jesus).	
Tallinn St. Catherine's Church	Disused (formerly Catholic)	13th–14th century	Tallinn; 59°26′16″N 24°44′54″E		Dedicated to St. Catherine of Alexandria. Central building of the former St. Catherine's Monastery of the Dominican Order. Burned down after the Reformation in the 1530s and was repurposed. Currently a concert and conference hall.	
Tallinn St. Anthony's Chapel	Demolished (formerly Catholic)	14th century	Tallinn; 59°25′48″N 24°44′31″E		Dedicated to St. Anthony the Great. The chapel was occasionally also called the "St. Anthony's Church" and the existence of a separate church and chapel cannot be ruled out. The chapel or the church gave name to the Tõnismäe ("St. Anthony's Hill") subdistrict of Tallinn. The chapel was likely demolished during the Livonian War, either strategically by the defending Swedes or by the Muscovites laying siege to the town in 1570–1571 and 1577. In 1670, the first, wooden Charles' Church was built on the same location. It was burned down for strategic purposes by the defending Swedes during the Great Northern War in 1710. The later Temporary Charles' Church and the current Charles' Church were built to nearby sites.	
Tallinn Cathedral of St. Simeon and St. Anna the Prophetess	Estonian Orthodox	1755	Tallinn; 59°26′24″N 24°45′37″E		Dedicated to St. Simeon and St. Anna the Prophetess. Seat of the Metropolitan of Tallinn and All Estonia, the primate of the Estonian Apostolic Orthodox Church.	
Tallinn Cathedral of the Transfiguration of Our Lord	Estonian Orthodox (formerly Lutheran)	13th century	Tallinn; 59°26′23″N 24°44′37″E		Dedicated to the transfiguration of Our Lord (Jesus). Was originally built for the church of the St Michael's Monastery of the Cistercian Order which was closed in 1629 and the church was thereafter given to the Swedish St. Michael's Congregation. In 1734, it was turned into an Orthodox church.	
Tallinn St. Alexander Nevsky Chapel	Demolished (formerly Estonian Orthodox)	1888	Tallinn; 59°26′14″N 24°45′13″E		Dedicated to St. Alexander Nevsky, the Grand Prince of Novgorod, known in Estonia for his leadership in the Battle of the Ice. Chapel of ease of first the Cathedral of the Transfiguration of Our Lord and thereafter of the Tallinn Church of the Entry of the Mother of God into the Temple, which itself was a chapel of ease of the Pühtitsa Convent of Kuremäe. The chapel was demolished in 1922.	
Tallinn St. Nicholas' Chapel	Demolished (formerly Estonian Orthodox)	1903	Tallinn; 59°26′21″N 24°44′13″E		Dedicated to St. Nicholas. Was a chapel of ease of the Tallinn Church of Bishop St. Nicholas the Miracle-Maker. Was demolished in 1922.	
Tallinn Church of the Entry of the Mother of God into the Temple	Demolished (formerly Estonian Orthodox)	1902	Tallinn; 59°26′09″N 24°45′42″E		Dedicated to the Entry of the Mother of God into the Temple. Chapel of ease of the Pühtitsa Convent of Kuremäe, Ida-Viru County. Demolished during the Soviet occupation in 1960.	
Church of the Tallinn St. Alexander Nevsky Cemetery	Demolished (formerly Estonian Orthodox)	1856	Tallinn; 59°25′31″N 24°45′24″E		Dedicated to St. Alexander Nevsky, the Grand Prince of Novgorod, known in Estonia for his leadership in the Battle of the Ice. Burned down in the March Bombing of 1944.	
Tallinn Alexander Nevsky Cathedral	Russian Orthodox	1900	Tallinn; 59°26′09″N 24°44′21″E		Officially the "Cathedral of the Pious Orthodox Grand Prince Alexander Nevsky". Dedicated to St. Alexander Nevsky, the Grand Prince of Novgorod, known in Estonia for his leadership in the Battle of the Ice. Seat of the Metropolitan of Tallinn and All Estonia, the primate of the Estonian Orthodox Church of Moscow Patriarchate.	
Tallinn Church of Bishop St. Nicholas the Miracle-Maker	Russian Orthodox	1827	Tallinn; 59°26′21″N 24°44′56″E		Dedicated to St. Nicholas. Distinguished from the other St. Nicholas' churches in Tallinn in Estonian by usage of the Russian name "Nikolai".	
Tallinn Green Market Chapel	Russian Orthodox	1909	Tallinn; 59°26′22″N 24°44′49″E		Built by the Pühtitsa Convent to commemorate the 15th anniversary of the reign of Emperor Nicholas II of Russia.	
Tallinn Kazan Church	Russian Orthodox	1721	Tallinn; 59°25′49″N 24°45′36″E		Officially the "Church of the Kazan Icon of the Nativity of the Mother of God". Dedicated to the Our Lady of Kazan icon of the Nativity of the Mother of God (Mary, mother of Jesus)", the original icon being from Kazan, Russia.	
Red Chapel of the Tallinn St. Alexander Nevsky Cemetery	Russian Orthodox	late 19th century	Tallinn; 59°25′30″N 24°45′22″E		Former chapel of ease of the Church of the Tallinn St. Alexander Nevsky Cemetery which burned down in 1944.	
Tallinn Old Believers Chapel	Russian Orthodox; Old Believer	1930	Tallinn; 59°25′51″N 24°42′57″E			
Church of St. John's almshouse	Armenian Apostolic (formerly Catholic)	14th–18th century	Tallinn; 59°26′02″N 24°45′42″E		The only Armenian Apostolic church in Estonia, ceded to the congregation in 1993.	
Tallinn Pae Oratory	Lutheran		Tallinn (Lasnamäe); 59°25′57″N 24°48′38″E		Dedicated to St. Mark the Evangelist	
Tallinn Church of the "Quick to Hearken" Icon of the Mother of God	Russian Orthodox	2013	Tallinn (Lasnamäe); 59°27′04″N 24°50′24″E		Dedicated to the "Quick to Hearken" icon of the Mother of God (Mary, mother of Jesus). Also known as the "Lasnamäe Church".	
Tallinn Church of the "Joy of All the Afflicted" Icon of the Mother of God	Russian Orthodox	1913	Tallinn (Kopli); 59°26′57″N 24°42′00″E		Dedicated to the "Joy of All the Afflicted" icon of the Mother of God (Mary, mother of Jesus). Also known as the "Baltic Cotton Factory's Settlement Church".	
Tallinn Bishop St. Nicholas' Church	Russian Orthodox	1936	Tallinn (Kopli); 59°27′41″N 24°40′13″E		Dedicated to Bishop St. Nicholas. The first St. Nicholas' church in Kopli was built in 1913 and was located in the territory of the Russian-Baltic shipyard nearby; it burned down in 1934. It is distinguished from the other St. Nicholas' churches in Tallinn in Estonian by usage of the Latin name "Nikolaus".	
Sutlepa Chapel	Lutheran	1699	Tallinn (Rocca al Mare); 59°26′06″N 24°38′24″E		The first chapel in Sutlepa, Lääne County existed already by 1627. It was reconstructed in 1834 or 1837, partially using the material from the demolished Rooslepa Chapel. The chapel was relocated to the Estonian Open Air Museum in Tallinn in 1970. Chapel of ease of Tallinn St. John's Church.	
Mustamäe Church of St. Mary Magdalene	Lutheran	2019	Tallinn (Mustamäe); 59°24′33″N 24°41′51″E		Dedicated to St. Mary Magdalene. Also known as the "Mustamäe Church".	
Nõmme Peace Church	Lutheran	1901	Tallinn (Nõmme); 59°23′08″N 24°40′43″E		Dedicated to the commemoration of the Tartu Peace Treaty that ended the Estonian War of Independence	
Chapel of the Charles' Congregation at the Rahumäe Cemetery	Lutheran	1913	Tallinn (Nõmme); 59°23′29″N 24°42′10″E		Chapel of ease of the Tallinn Charles' Church; the chapel is a miniature version of the church and therefore one of the few religious buildings in Estonia with two towers.	
Chapel of the Holy Spirit Congregation at the Rahumäe Cemetery	Lutheran	1932	Tallinn (Nõmme); 59°23′30″N 24°41′49″E		Chapel of ease of the Tallinn Church of the Holy Spirit	
Nõmme German Church of the Redeemer	Lutheran	1932	Tallinn (Nõmme); 59°23′06″N 24°41′29″E		Dedicated to Jesus Christ, the Redeemer	
Nõmme Baptist Oratory	Baptist	1931	Tallinn (Nõmme); 59°23′09″N 24°40′42″E			
Tallinn Harku Moravian Oratory	Moravian	1931	Tallinn (Nõmme); 59°23′09″N 24°39′55″E		Named after its location on Harku Street	
Nõmme St. John the Baptist's Church	Russian Orthodox	1923	Tallinn (Nõmme); 59°23′02″N 24°40′36″E		Dedicated to St. John the Baptist	
Chapel of the Holy Spirit Congregation at the Rahumäe Cemetery	Nondenominational	1935	Tallinn (Nõmme); 59°22′47″N 24°43′43″E			
Tallinn Mähe Baptist Church	Baptist	1939	Tallinn (Pirita); 59°29′18″N 24°52′36″E			
Pirita Convent	Disused, in ruins (formerly Catholic)	1436	Tallinn (Pirita); 59°27′59″N 24°50′10″E		Dedicated to St. Bridget of Sweden. A former convent of the Order of the Most Holy Savior St. Bridget. Burned down in two consecutive Russian raids during the Livonian War in 1575 and 1577.	
Pirita New Convent	Catholic	2001	Tallinn (Pirita); 59°28′02″N 24°50′10″E		Officially the "Pirita Convent of the Order of the Most Holy Savior St. Bridget". Dedicated to St. Bridget of Sweden	
Koch Family Chapel	Disused (formerly Lutheran)	1874	Tallinn (Pirita); 59°27′48″N 24°50′01″E			
Tallinn Forest Cemetery Chapel	Nondenominational	1936	Tallinn (Pirita); 59°28′11″N 24°52′02″E			
Tõdva Moravian Oratory	Moravian	1888	Tõdva; 59°15′53″N 24°44′06″E			
Tuhala Church	Lutheran	1777	Kata, near Tuhala; 59°11′45″N 24°58′00″E		Dedicated to Tuhala Manor owner Carl Johan Mellin	
Valkla Baptist Oratory	Baptist	1903	Valkla; 59°27′29″N 25°21′14″E			
Viimsi Free Congregation Oratory	Evangelical	1935	Haabneeme, Viimsi Parish; 59°31′05″N 24°48′43″E			
Viimsi St. Jacob's Church (also Viimsi St. James' Church)	Lutheran	2007	Haabneeme, Viimsi Parish; 59°31′15″N 24°48′29″E		Dedicated to St. James, son of Zebedee	

=== Hiiu County ===
Name	Denomination	Year	Location	Image	Notes	Refs
Emmaste Church	Lutheran	1867	Emmaste; 58°42′24″N 22°35′26″E		Dedicated to Saint Emmanuel	
Kassari Chapel	Lutheran	ca. 1801	Esiküla, Kassari Island; 58°48′37″N 22°51′52″E			
Käina Church	Disused, in ruins (formerly Lutheran)	c. 1500	Käina; 58°49′44″N 22°46′34″E		Dedicated to St. Martin of Tours	
Kärdla Church	Lutheran	1863	Kärdla; 59°00′10″N 22°45′09″E		Dedicated to St. John the Baptist	
Kõpu Church-School	Disused (formerly Estonian Orthodox)	1908	Kõpu; 58°54′54″N 22°12′40″E		Currently a community center	
Kuri Church	Estonian Orthodox (Disused, in ruins)	1891	Taterma, near Kuri; 58°57′13″N 22°55′38″E		Dedicated to the Ascension of the Christ	
Kuriste Church	Estonian Orthodox	1890	Kuriste; 58°47′56″N 22°37′14″E		Dedicated to the Nativity of the God-bearer (Mary, mother of Jesus). Also called the "Hiiumaa Church of the Nativity of the God-bearer".	
Malvaste Chapel	Estonian Orthodox	1925	Malvaste; 59°01′40″N 22°35′16″E		Dedicated to St. Elijah the Prophet	
Mänspe Church	Lutheran	1908	Mänspe; 58°49′19″N 22°27′53″E		Also called a chapel. Chapel of ease of Emmaste Church.	
Nurste Chapel	Baptist	1923	Nurste; 58°47′15″N 22°29′47″E			
Paluküla Church	Disused, in ruins (formerly Lutheran)	1820	Paluküla; 58°59′12″N 22°48′18″E		Also called a chapel.	
Pühalepa Church	Lutheran	13th century	Pühalepa; 58°52′24″N 22°57′20″E		Dedicated to St. Lawrence of Rome. Oldest building on Hiiumaa island.	
Puski Church	Disused (formerly Estonian Orthodox)	1891	Puski; 58°54′24″N 22°24′35″E		Dedicated to the Nativity of the Christ	
Reigi Church	Lutheran	1779–1802	Pihla, near Reigi; 58°58′58″N 22°30′35″E		Dedicated to Jesus	

=== Ida-Viru County ===
Name	Denomination	Year	Location	Image	Notes	Refs
Alajõe Church of the Nativity of the Mother of God	Russian Orthodox	1889	Alajõe; 59°00′34″N 27°25′23″E		Dedicated to the Nativity of the Mother of God (Mary, mother of Jesus)	
Aseri Church of St. Blessed Xenia of Saint Petersburg	Russian Orthodox	2010	Aseri; 59°27′10″N 26°51′38″E		Dedicated to the St. Blessed Xenia of Saint Petersburg	
Avinurme Church	Lutheran	1903-1909	Avinurme; 58°59′05″N 26°51′52″E			
Iisaku Church	Lutheran	1846	Iisaku; 59°06′04″N 27°18′30″E			
Illuka Church	Lutheran	1930	Illuka; 59°13′00″N 27°31′00″E			
Jaama Bishop St. Nicholas' Church	Russian Orthodox	1904	Jaama; 59°13′00″N 27°31′00″E		Dedicated to Bishop St. Nicholas	
Jõhvi Church	Lutheran	Mid 14th-century	Jõhvi; 59°21′34″N 27°24′39″E		Dedicated to St. Michael the Archangel	
Jõhvi Crucifixion of Our Lord Church	Russian Orthodox	1895	Jõhvi; 59°21′28″N 27°24′56″E		Dedicated to the Crucifixion of Our Lord (Jesus). Also known as the "Jõhvi Epiphany Church".	
Kiviõli St. Peter's Church	Lutheran	1938	Kiviõli		Dedicated to St. Peter	
Kiviõli Church of the Protection of the Mother of God	Russian Orthodox	20th century	Kiviõli; 59°21′15″N 26°58′04″E		Dedicated to the Protection of the Mother of God	
Kohtla-Järve Ahtme St. Josep's Church	Catholic	1995	Ahtme, Kohtla-Järve; 59°19′04″N 27°25′09″E		Dedicated to St. Joseph. Also known as the Ahtme Church of St. Francis of Assisi.	
Kohtla-Järve Church of the Transfiguration of Our Lord	Russian Orthodox	1938	Järve, Kohtla-Järve; 59°23′51″N 27°14′35″E		Dedicated to the transfiguration of Our Lord (Jesus)	
Kuremäe Cathedral of the Dormition of the Mother of God	Russian Orthodox	1910	Kuremäe; 59°11′57″N 27°32′06″E		Dedicated to the Dormition of the Mother of God. Central church of the Pühtitsa Convent. Called a cathedral despite not housing a bishop.	
Kuremäe Church of Bishop St. Nicholas and the Pious Arseny the Great	Russian Orthodox	1885	Kuremäe; 59°12′05″N 27°32′05″E		Dedicated to Bishop St. Nicholas and Arseny Bryantsev, the Orthodox Archbishop of Riga, the founder of the Pühtitsa Convent. Secondary church of the Pühtitsa Convent.	
Kuremäe Church of Metropolitan Alexius of Moscow and Martyr Varvara	Russian Orthodox	1986	Kuremäe; 59°11′57″N 27°32′06″E		Dedicated to the St. Alexius, Metropolitan of Moscow and Martyr St. Varvara. Secondary church of the Pühtitsa Convent.	
Kuremäe Church of St. John the Baptist and Hieromartyr Priest Isidor of Tartu	Russian Orthodox	1990	Kuremäe; 59°11′49″N 27°32′10″E		Dedicated to St. John the Baptist and the 15th century Hieromartyr Priest Isidor of Tartu. Secondary church of the Pühtitsa Convent.	
Kuremäe Church of St. Simeon the Righteous and St. Anna the Prohetess	Russian Orthodox	1895	Kuremäe; 59°11′56″N 27°32′07″E		Dedicated to St. Simeon the Righteous and St. Anna the Prophetess. Secondary church of the Pühtitsa Convent.	
Kuremäe Church of the Pious St. Sergius of Radonezh	Russian Orthodox	1895	Kuremäe; 59°11′50″N 27°32′11″E		Dedicated to the Pious St. Sergius of Radonezh. Secondary church of the Pühtitsa Convent.	
Lohusuu Church	Lutheran	1882	58°57′05″N 27°02′45″E			
Lohusuu Crucifixion of Our Lord Church	Russian Orthodox	1898	58°56′45″N 27°03′27″E		Dedicated to the Crucifixion of Our Lord (Jesus)	
Lüganuse Church	Lutheran	Mid 14th century	Lüganuse; 59°22′44″N 27°02′26″E		Dedicated to St. John the Baptist	
Narva Alexander's Cathedral	Lutheran	1881-1884	Narva; 59°22′14″N 28°12′07″E		Dedicated to Alexander II of Russia. Was named a "cathedral" (or rather a "grand church") by President Lennart Georg Meri in 2000 despite not housing a bishop.	
Narva Church of the Narva Icon of the Mother of God	Russian Orthodox	2003	Narva; 59°23′10″N 28°11′33″E		Dedicated to the Narva Icon of the Mother of God (Mary, mother of Jesus)	
Narva Resurrection of Our Lord Cathedral	Russian Orthodox	1896	Narva; 59°22′16″N 28°11′37″E		Dedicated to the resurrection of Our Lord (Jesus). Seat of the Bishop of Narva of the Estonian Orthodox Church of Moscow Patriarchate.	
Narva St. Anthony's Chapel	Catholic		Narva; 59°22′53″N 28°11′34″E		Dedicated to St. Anthony	
Narva Church of St. Cyril and Methodius	Russian Orthodox	2015	Narva; 59°22′38″N 28°10′20″E		Dedicated to Sts. Cyril and Methodius	
Narva St. Michael's Church	Lutheran		Narva; 59°22′23″N 28°10′50″E		Dedicated to St. Michael the Archangel	
Narva-Jõesuu Church of St. Prince Vladimir	Russian Orthodox		Narva-Jõesuu; 59°27′00″N 28°01′29″E		Dedicated to St. Prince Vladimir of Novgorod. Removed from Meriküla.	
Pühajõe Church	Lutheran	1839	Pühajõe; 59°24′43″N 27°32′14″E			
Sillamäe Church of the Kazan Icon of the Mother of God	Russian Orthodox	1995	Sillamäe; 59°23′36″N 27°45′29″E		Dedicated to the Our Lady of Kazan icon of the Mother of God (Mary, mother of Jesus)", the original icon being from Kazan, Russia.	
Sillamäe St. George's and St. Adalbert's Church	Catholic	2001	Sillamäe; 59°23′57″N 27°45′53″E		Dedicated to St. George and St. Adalbert	
Tudulinna Church	Lutheran	1939	Tudulinna; 59°02′12″N 27°04′35″E			
Tudulinna Old Church	Disused, in ruins (formerly Lutheran)	1766	Tudulinna; 59°02′16″N 27°04′35″E			
Vasknarva Church of St. Elijah the Prophet	Russian Orthodox	1873	Vasknarva; 58°59′51″N 27°44′14″E		Dedicated to St. Elijah the Prophet. Skete of the Kuremäe Pühtitsa Convent.	

=== Jõgeva County ===
Name	Denomination	Year	Location	Image	Notes	Refs
Kodavere Church	Protestant	1775-1777	Kodavere; 58°41′32″N 27°09′02″E		A first church built on the site in 1342. According to a local story, the previous name of this church was Mihkli Church, after a man named Mihkel who was walled into one of its walls.	
Kursi Church	Protestant		Kursi; 58°35′33″N 26°20′35″E			
Laiuse Church	Lutheran	14th century	Laiuse; 58°46′47″N 26°30′12″E		Dedicated to St. George	
Laiuse Church of the Nativity of the Mother of God	Disused, in ruins (formerly Orthodox)	1864	Laiusevälja; 58°48′22″N 26°31′26″E		Dedicated to the Nativity of the Mother of God (Mary, mother of Jesus)	
Maarja-Magdaleena Church	Protestant	Mid 14th century	Maarja-Magdaleena; 58°36′38″N 26°44′23″E			
Mustvee Church	Protestant	1877-1880	Mustvee; 58°50′54″N 26°56′04″E			
Mustvee Holy Trinity Church	Estonian Orthodox (formerly Orthodox Edinoverie)	1877	Mustvee			
Palamuse Church	Protestant	First half of 13th century	Palamuse; 58°41′02″N 26°35′00″E			
Põltsamaa Church	Protestant	1632-1633	Põltsamaa; 58°39′11″N 25°58′26″E		Located adjacent to Põltsamaa Castle.	
Raja Sanctuary	Old Believer		Kasepää; 58°49′14″N 26°56′44″E			
Torma Church	Protestant	1755-1766	Torma; 58°48′33″N 26°45′17″E			

=== Järva County ===
Name	Denomination	Year	Location	Image	Notes	Refs
Ambla Church	Protestant	Mid-13th century	Ambla; 59°11′32″N 25°50′21″E			
Anna Church	Protestant	1776-1780	Anna; 59°00′09″N 25°35′40″E			
Järva-Jaani Church	Protestant	c. 1300	59°02′24″N 25°52′53″E			
Järva-Madise Church	Protestant	Late 13th century	Järva-Madise; 59°06′57″N 25°39′21″E		The smallest church in Järva-Madise was built by the Swedes. The church and what happened in it are described in the book Tõde ja õigus (Truth and Justice) by A. H. Tammsaare.	
Järva-Peetri Church	Protestant	14th century	Peetri; 58°56′33″N 25°50′08″E			
Koeru Church	Protestant	Second half of 13th century	Koeru; 58°57′51″N 26°01′50″E			
Paide Church	Lutheran	16th century	Paide; 58°53′15″N 25°34′13″E			
Türi Church	Protestant	Late 13th century	Türi; 58°48′34″N 25°25′45″E			

=== Lääne County ===
Name	Denomination	Year	Location	Image	Notes	Refs
Haapsalu Cathedral	Protestant	Late 1260s	Haapsalu; 58°56′50″N 23°32′19″E		An integral part of Haapsalu Castle.	
Orthodox Church of St Mary Magdalene	Estonian Orthodox	1845-1852	Haapsalu; 58°56′58″N 23°32′25″E			
Orthodox Church of St Alexander Nevsky	Estonian Orthodox	1896-1900	Haapsalu; 58°56′27″N 23°32′15″E			
Church of St. John	Protestant	1524	Haapsalu; 58°56′56″N 23°32′29″E			
Hanila Church	Protestant	Mid-13th century	Hanila; 58°36′48″N 23°36′29″E		Constructed by the Livonian Order.	
Karuse Church	Protestant	1260s	Karuse; 58°38′11″N 23°41′23″E		Pulpit by Christian Ackermann; Otto von Lutterberg is buried in this church.	
Kirbla Church	Protestant	c. 1500	Kirbla; 58°43′43″N 23°56′30″E		Constructed by the Bishop of Ösel-Wiek, during Johannes III Orgas reign.	
Kullamaa Church	Protestant	13th century	Kullamaa; 58°52′51″N 24°04′33″E		Duchess Augusta of Brunswick-Wolfenbüttel is buried in the church	
Lihula Church	Protestant	1878	Lihula; 58°41′28″N 23°50′11″E			
Martna Church	Protestant	16th century	Martna; 58°51′23″N 23°47′41″E		Constructed by the Bishop of Ösel-Wiek, during Johannes III Orgas reign.	
Noarootsi Church	Protestant	c. 1500	Martna; 58°02′16″N 23°30′32″E			
Ridala Church	Protestant	Second half of 13th century	Kolila; 58°52′39″N 23°36′19″E			
Vormsi Church	Protestant	Probably 14th century	Hullo, Vormsi Island; 58°59′58″N 23°14′00″E			
Vormsi Orthodox Church	Orthodox	1889	Hullo, Vormsi Island			

=== Lääne-Viru County ===
Name	Denomination	Year	Location	Image	Notes	Refs
Haljala Church	Protestant	Second quarter of 15th century	Haljala; 59°25′53″N 26°16′06″E			
Kadrina Church	Protestant	Mid 15th century	Haljala; 59°20′29″N 26°07′44″E			
Käsmu Church	Protestant	1863-64	Käsmu; 59°36′09″N 25°55′04″E			
Rakvere Church	Protestant	Early 15th century	Rakvere; 59°20′49″N 26°21′25″E			
Rakvere Orthodox Church	Orthodox	1839	Rakvere			
Simuna Church	Protestant	Late 15th century	Simuna; 59°02′41″N 26°24′04″E		ALtarpiece by Christian Ackermann; Carl Timoleon von Neff buried in the cemetery	
Tapa Church	Protestant	1932	Tapa; 59°15′49″N 25°57′39″E			
Tapa Orthodox Church	Orthodox	1904	Tapa; 59°15′54″N 25°57′52″E			
Viru-Jaagupi Church	Protestant	First half of 15th century	Viru-Jaagupi; 59°14′38″N 26°28′23″E			
Viru-Nigula Church	Protestant	Second half of 13th century	Viru-Nigula; 59°26′46″N 26°41′21″E			
Väike-Marja Church	Protestant	End of 15th century	Väike-Maarja; 59°07′49″N 26°14′58″E			

=== Pärnu County ===
Name	Denomination	Year	Location	Image	Notes	Refs
Häädemeeste Church	Protestant	1874	Häädemeeste; 58°04′47″N 24°29′57″E			
Häädemeeste Orthodox Church	Orthodox	1870-1872	Häädemeeste			
Kihnu St. Nicholas' Church	Orthodox, before 1857 Lutheran	1786	Kihnu			
Mihkli Church	Lutheran		Mihkli			
Pärnu Cathedral of the Transfiguration of Our Lord	Estonian Orthodox	1904	Pärnu; 58°23′02″N 24°30′22″E		Dedicated to the transfiguration of Our Lord (Jesus). Seat of the Bishop of Pärnu and Saare of the Estonian Apostolic Orthodox Church.	
Pootsi-Kõpu Orthodox Church	Orthodox	1873	Kõpu			
St. Catherine's Church, Pärnu	Orthodox	1764-68	Pärnu; 58°23′06″N 24°29′52″E			
St. Elizabeth's Church, Pärnu	Lutheran	1741-47	Pärnu; 58°23′01″N 24°30′00″E			
Pärnu-Jaagupi Church	Lutheran	1531-34	Pärnu-Jaagupi; 58°36′41″N 24°30′19″E			
Saarde Church	Lutheran	1858-59	Saarde; 58°08′31″N 24°58′06″E			
Tori Church	Lutheran	1852-54	Tori; 58°29′N 24°49′E		Designated Memorial Church to Estonian Soldiers	
Varbla Church	Lutheran	1860-61	Helmküla; 58°27′20″N 23°44′57″E			

=== Põlva County ===
Name	Denomination	Year	Location	Image	Notes	Refs
Kanepi Church	Protestant	1806-10	Kanepi; 57°59′10″N 26°45′35″E			
Kähri Church	Orthodox	1900	Kähri; 58°01′40″N 26°59′18″E			
Kärsa Church	Orthodox	1878	Kärsa; 58°10′59″N 27°06′18″E			
Räpina Church	Protestant	1785	Räpina; 58°05′58″N 27°27′29″E			

=== Rapla County ===
Name	Denomination	Year	Location	Image	Notes	Refs
Hageri Church	Lutheran	First mentioned in 1424	Hageri; 59°09′34″N 24°39′03″E			
Juuru Church	Lutheran	14th century	Juuru; 59°03′37″N 24°57′15″E			
Kohila Church	Orthodox	1899-1900	Kohila; 59°03′37″N 24°57′15″E			
Käru Church	Orthodox	1860	Kohila; 59°03′37″N 24°57′15″E			
Märjamaa Church	Lutheran	14th century	Märjamaa; 58°54′39″N 24°25′53″E			
Rapla Church	Lutheran	1901	Rapla; 58°59′40″N 24°48′04″E		Pulpit by Christian Ackermann	
Vahastu Church	Lutheran	1883	Vahastu; 58°57′04″N 25°16′06″E			

=== Saare County ===
Name	Denomination	Year	Location	Image	Notes	Refs
Hellamaa Church	Orthodox	1866	Hellamaa			
Karja Church	Lutheran	13.-14.century	Linnaka; 58°31′24″N 22°43′57″E		The rural church with the richest medieval stone sculpture decoration in all the Baltic states	
Kaarma Church	Lutheran	1260s	Kaarma; 58°20′50″N 22°30′39″E			
Kihelkonna Church	Lutheran	c. 1250	Kihelkonna; 58°21′36″N 22°02′08″E			
Kuressaare Church	Lutheran	1620s	Kuressaare; 58°15′14″N 22°29′12″E			
Muhu Church	Lutheran	1267	Muhu; 58°36′14″N 23°13′34″E		Founded by Otto von Lutterberg	
Pöide Church	Lutheran	First half of 13th century	Pöide; 58°30′40″N 23°02′53″E			
Püha Church	Lutheran	Second half of 13th century	Püha; 58°18′12″N 22°43′11″E			
Saint Magdalene Church, Ruhnu	Lutheran	1643-1644	Ruhnu		Oldest preserved wooden church in Estonia	
Saint Magdalene church, Ruhnu	Lutheran	1912	Ruhnu		Built next to the old church.	
Valjala Church	Lutheran	1227	Püha; 58°24′29″N 22°47′19″E			

=== Tartu County ===
Name	Denomination	Year	Location	Image	Notes	Refs
Alatskivi Church	Lutheran	1840-1870	Alatskivi; 58°36′24″N 27°08′26″E			
Immaculate Conception Church, Tartu	Roman Catholic	1899	Tartu; 58°22′57.6″N 26°42′36.0″E			
Kambja Church	Lutheran	15.century	Kambja; 58°14′10″N 26°42′00″E			
Nõo Church	Lutheran	Mid 13th century	Nõo; 58°16′38″N 26°32′05″E			
Nõo Orthodox Church	Orthodox	1873	Nõo; 58°16′13″N 26°32′23″E			
Tartu Cathedral	Disused	Mid 13th century	Tartu; 58°22′48″N 26°42′50″E		Partly ruined; former seat of the Bishopric of Dorpat	
Dormition Cathedral, Tartu	Estonian Orthodox	1782	Tartu; 58°23′02″N 24°30′22″E		Dedicated to the dormition of the Mother of God. Also called the "Uspenski Cathedral". Seat of the Bishop of Tartu of the Estonian Apostolic Orthodox Church.	
St Alexander's Church, Tartu	Estonian Orthodox	1914	Tartu; 58°21′51.9″N 26°43′43.6″E			
St George's Church, Tartu	Russian Orthodox	1870	Tartu; 58°23′14.0″N 26°43′38.5″E			
St. John's Church, Tartu	Lutheran	14th century	Tartu; 58°22′58″N 26°43′09″E			
St Mary's Church, Tartu	Lutheran	1841	Tartu; 58°22′34.9″N 26°43′00.4″E			
St. Paul's Church, Tartu	Lutheran	1915-17	Tartu		Designed by architect Eliel Saarinen	
St Peter's Church, Tartu	Lutheran	1884	Tartu; 58°23′25.0″N 26°43′43.1″E			
Vara Church	Lutheran	1855	Vara; 58°30′02″N 26°52′44″E			

=== Valga County ===
Name	Denomination	Year	Location	Image	Notes	Refs
Hargla Church	Lutheran	1817–1821	Hargla; 57°36′49″N 26°23′45″E			
Karula St. Mary's Church	Lutheran	2nd half of 15th century	Lüllemäe		In a ruined state.	
Otepää Church	Lutheran	19th century	Otepää; 58°03′34″N 26°30′07″E			
Sangaste Church	Lutheran	1742	Sangaste; 57°55′34″N 26°19′56″E			
Taagepera Church	Lutheran	1674	Taagepera; 58°00′49″N 25°41′10″E			
Valga Church (Valga St. John's Church)	Lutheran	1787-1816	Valga; 57°46′37″N 26°01′51″E			

=== Viljandi County ===
Name	Denomination	Year	Location	Image	Notes	Refs
Halliste Holy Anna Church	Lutheran	15th c.	Pornuse		Current exterior look was built in 1867, but parts of the building date back to 15th c.	
Peter's Church	Lutheran	1773-78	Karksi-Nuia; 58°06′16″N 25°33′54″E			
Pilitsvere Church	Lutheran	13th century	Pilistvere; 58°39′46″N 25°44′57″E			
Suure-Jaani Church	Lutheran	c. 1300	Suure-Jaani; 58°32′01″N 25°28′05″E			
Viljandi Church	Lutheran	End of 13th century	Viljandi; 58°21′44″N 25°35′43″E			
Viljandi St. Paul's Church	Lutheran	1866	Viljandi; 58°21′48″N 25°35′29″E			

=== Võru County ===
Name	Denomination	Year	Location	Image	Notes	Refs
Rõuge Church	Lutheran	1729-30	Rõuge; 57°43′52″N 26°55′43″E			
St. Catherine's Church, Võru	Orthodox	1793-1804	Võru; 58°21′48″N 25°35′29″E			
