= Mihkli Nature Reserve =

Protected area in Estonia

- Location within Estonia
- Location: Estonia
- Nearest city: Lihula
- Coordinates: 58°37′25″N 24°07′15″E
- Area: 89 ha (220 acres)
- Established: 1957

Mihkli Nature Reserve is a nature reserve situated in Mihkli village in south-western Estonia, in Pärnu County.

Mihkli Nature Reserve has been created to protect one of Estonia's most important oak forests. Based on studies conducted in 1978, the oak grove is estimated to date from approximately 1750. About half of the trees are straight-trunked oaks, and the largest individual oak reaches a circumference of 383 centimetres and a height of 23 metres. Additional species in the forest include grey alder, lime, ash, and larch. The grove also has a dense hazel understorey reaching up to five metres in height, along with hawthorn, juniper, and blackthorn. Old birches of 120 to 130 years in age also grow within the reserve, along with European crab apple. Stone walls along the forest margins provide additional habitat for wildlife.

The reserve was established specifically to protect the oak grove’s rich biodiversity. It is designated to conserve two species listed in Annex II of the EU Habitats Directive: the green fork moss (Dicranum viride), a rare liverwort-like moss that grows on the trunks of old oaks, and the hen-of-the-woods fungus (Grifola frondosa). A study conducted in 1935 recorded 193 species of invertebrates in the grove.

The reserve was originally established as a botanical-zoological conservation area of the Estonian SSR on 11 July 1957 by the Council of Ministers of the Estonian SSR who indicated the significance of this area for nature protection. Its current size and protection rules were re-affirmed by a regulation of a Government of the Republic in June 2017. According to Estonian Environmental Information System (EELIS) the area is actively preserved as a protected-area. It has a land of 88.7 ha and administered by the Keskkonnaamet (the Estonian Environment Agency). The Estonian reserve also belongs to Natura 2000 European ecological network where it is called Mihkli loodusala – EE0040307.
