= Püha, Saare County =

Village in Saare County, Estonia

Püha
- Village
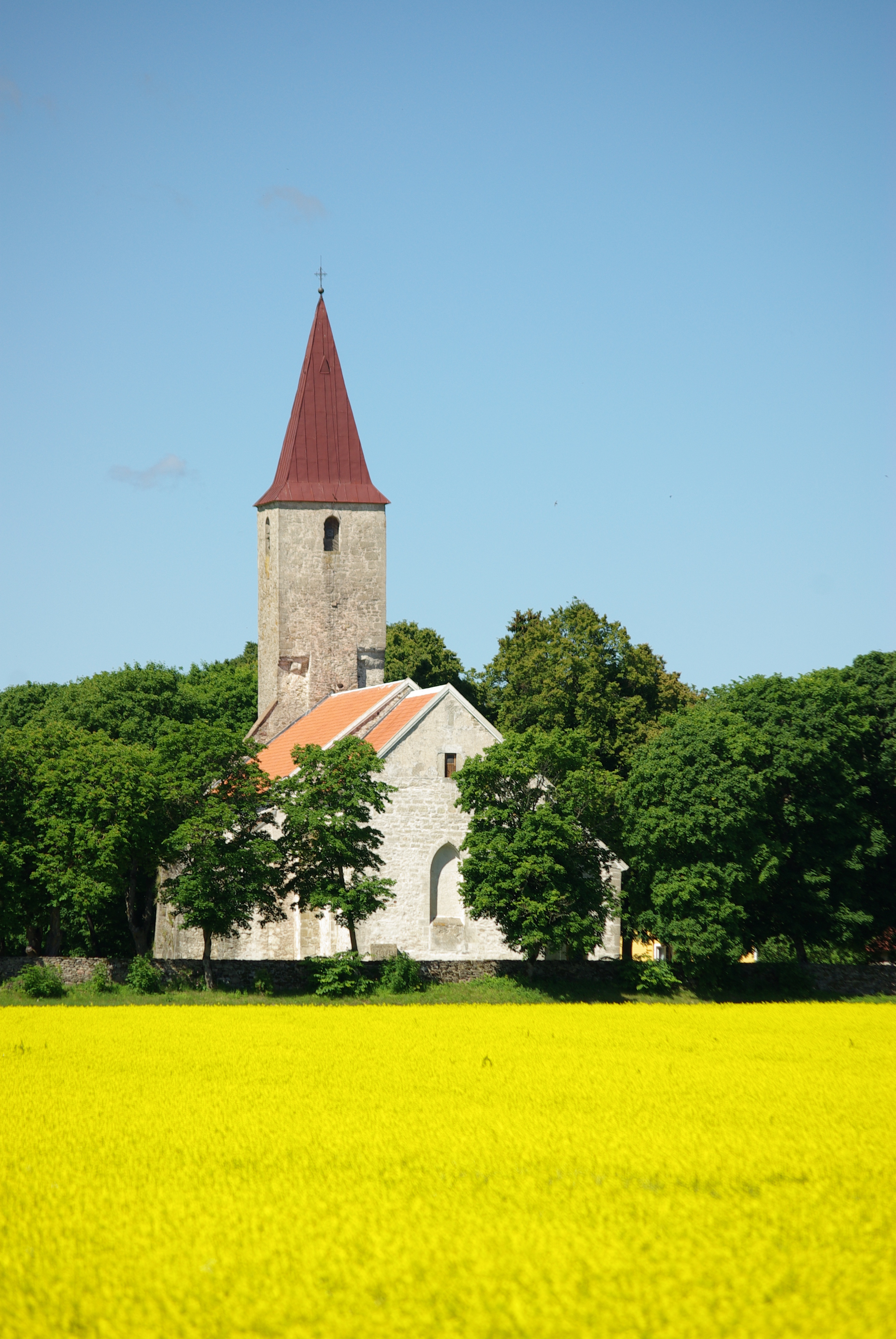
- Püha church
- Interactive map of Püha
- Coordinates: 58°18′12″N 22°43′11″E
- Country: Estonia
- County: Saare County
- Parish: Saaremaa Parish
- Time zone: UTC+2 (EET)
  - Summer (DST): UTC+3 (EEST)

Püha is a village in Saaremaa Parish, Saare County in western Estonia.

Before the administrative reform in 2017, the village was in Pihtla Parish.

== Püha Church ==
The church in Püha was founded sometime during the second half of the 13th century, and construction continued throughout the Middle Ages. Like other medieval churches on Saaremaa, the structure features an upper storey with a fireplace, intended as a place of refuge in times of trouble and accommodation for visiting pilgrims during times of peace. During the Livonian War, the church was torched by Russian troops and very badly damaged, so that little of the original decoration survives. The altarpiece was made by local master carver Gottfried Böhme of Kuressaare in 1793 and displays similarities with the altarpiece in Riga Cathedral. The painting of the altarpiece is likewise the work of a local artist, Ludwig von Sass, while the pulpit is a neoclassical piece, dating from 1793.
