= Church of St. John's almshouse =

Church in Tallinn, Estonia

Coordinates: 59.4338°N 24.7616°E

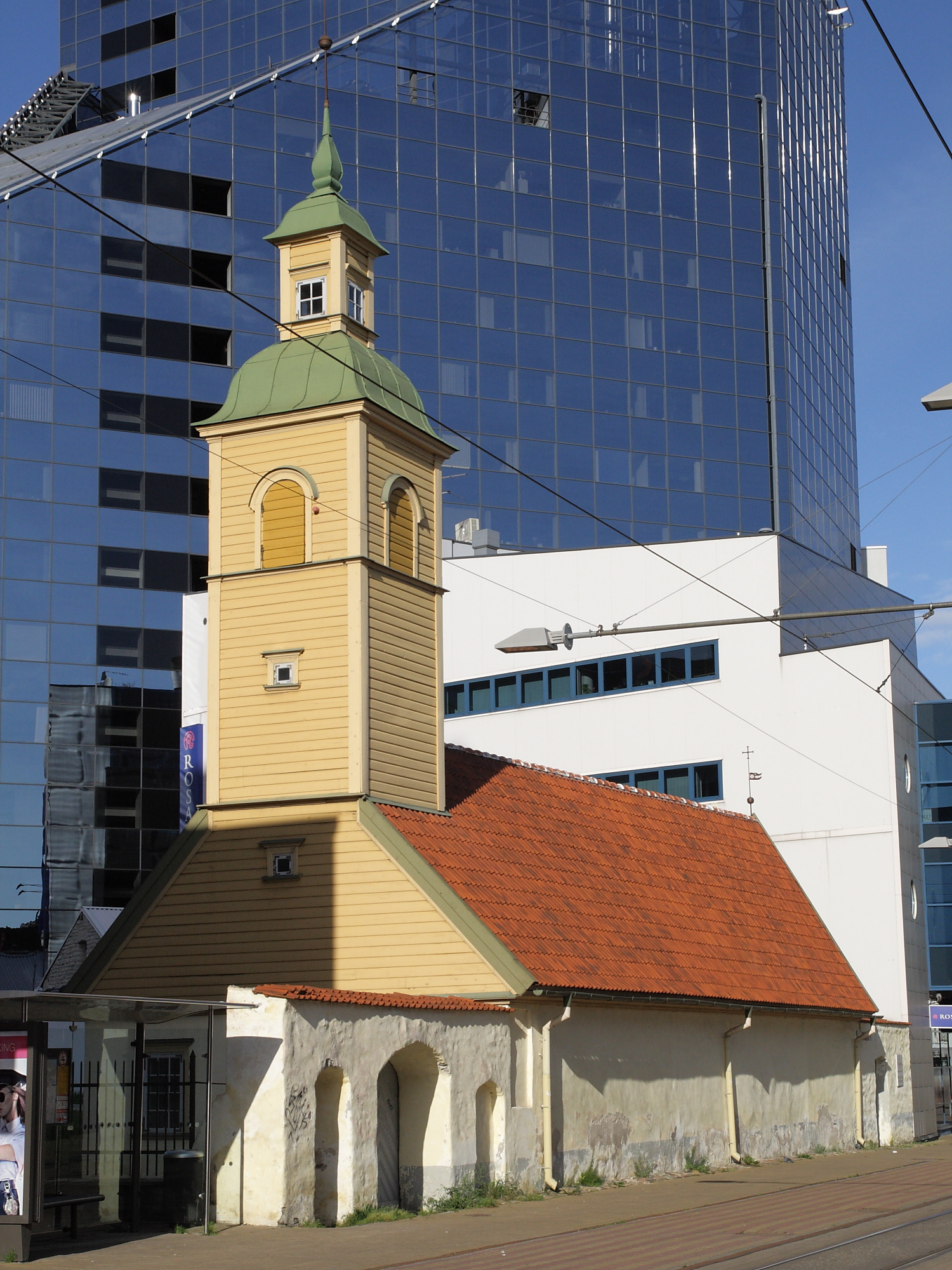
Church of St. John's almshouse

Church of St. John's almshouse (Estonian: Tallinna Jaani seegi kirik) is a wooden church in Tallinn, Estonia. Since 1999 the building is designated as "architectural monument".

Nowadays, the church is used by a congregation belonging to Armenian Apostolic Church.

The building's history dates back to the beginning of 13th century. Originally the building was a stone church and the building was named as John's hospital (Estonian: Jaani hospidal), later it was named to John's almshouse church (Estonian: Jaani seegi kirik). Historically, the building was also used as a leprosarium. In 1813 the hospital was officially named to almshouse (Estonian: vaestemaja).
