= Saha, Estonia =

Village in Estonia

Saha
- Village
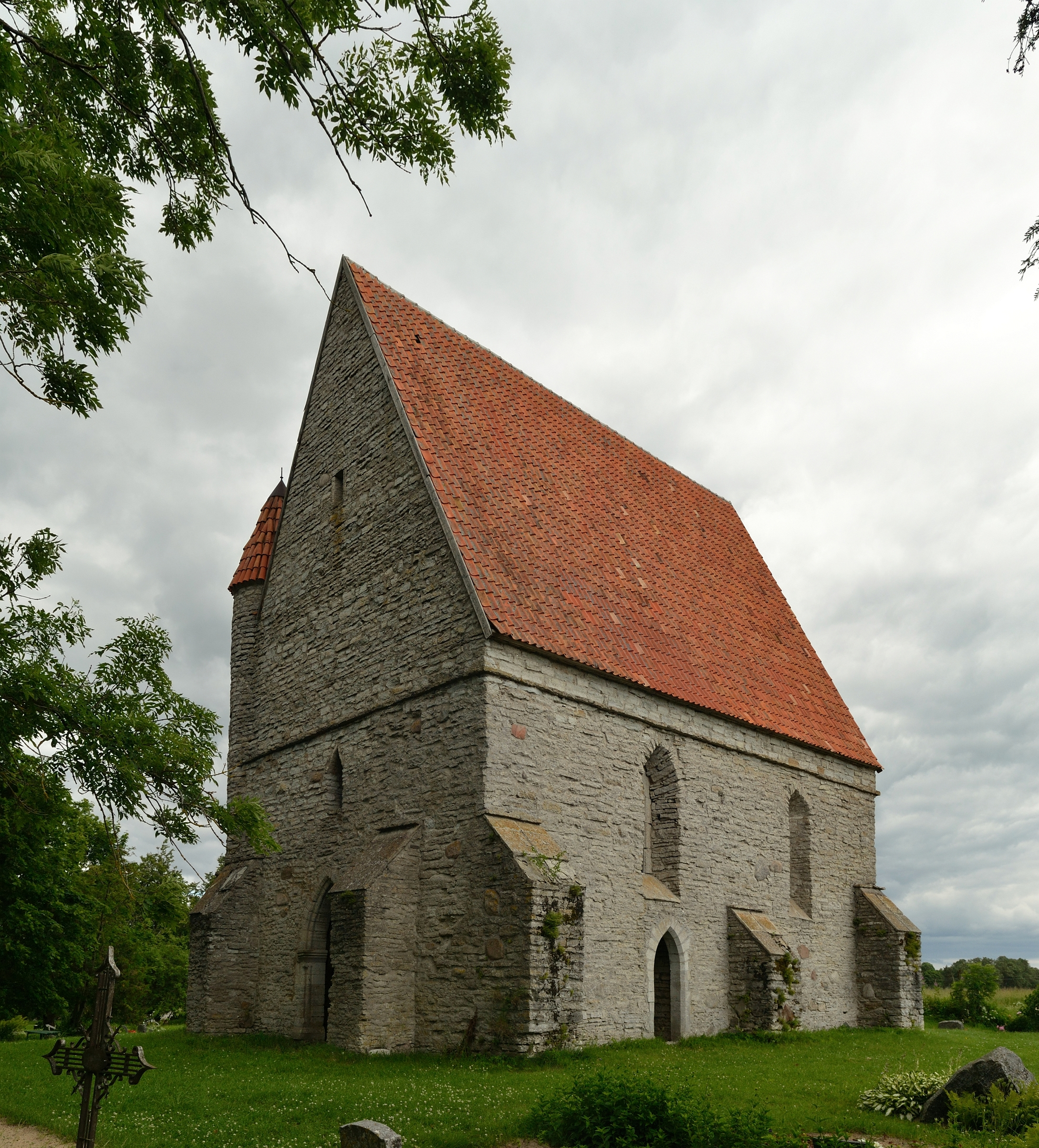
- Saha chapel

- Location within Estonia
- Coordinates: 59°25′N 24°58′E
- Country: Estonia
- County: Harju County
- Parish: Jõelähtme Parish
- Time zone: UTC+2 (EET)
  - Summer (DST): UTC+3 (EEST)

Saha (German: Saage) is a village in Jõelähtme Parish, Harju County in northern Estonia.

== Saha Chapel ==
The medieval chapel at Saha probably dates from about 1220, and was possibly built at the site of an earlier pagan place of worship, but the original structure was destroyed during an uprising in 1223. The present building dates from the early 15th century and shows some likeness to Pirita Convent, built around the same time. Saha chapel is unusually well-preserved and no major alterations have been made since its construction. Judging from details such as grooves made for bolting beams by the doors, the chapel probably also had a defensive function. The windows with their fine tracery, the staircase and the platter for holy water are especially noteworthy architectural details. Of the interior, only the limestone altar is original.
