= Mihkli =

Village in Estonia

- Village
- Interactive map of Mihkli
- Coordinates: 58°37′10″N 24°05′49″E
- Country: Estonia
- County: Pärnu County
- Parish: Lääneranna Parish
- Time zone: UTC+2 (EET)
  - Summer (DST): UTC+3 (EEST)

Mihkli (German: St. Michaelis) is a village in Lääneranna Parish, Pärnu County in southwestern Estonia. It was a part of Koonga Parish before 2017.

The Baltic German biosemiotician Jakob von Uexküll (1864–1944) was born in Keblas Manor, now part of Mihkli village.

== Mihkli church ==
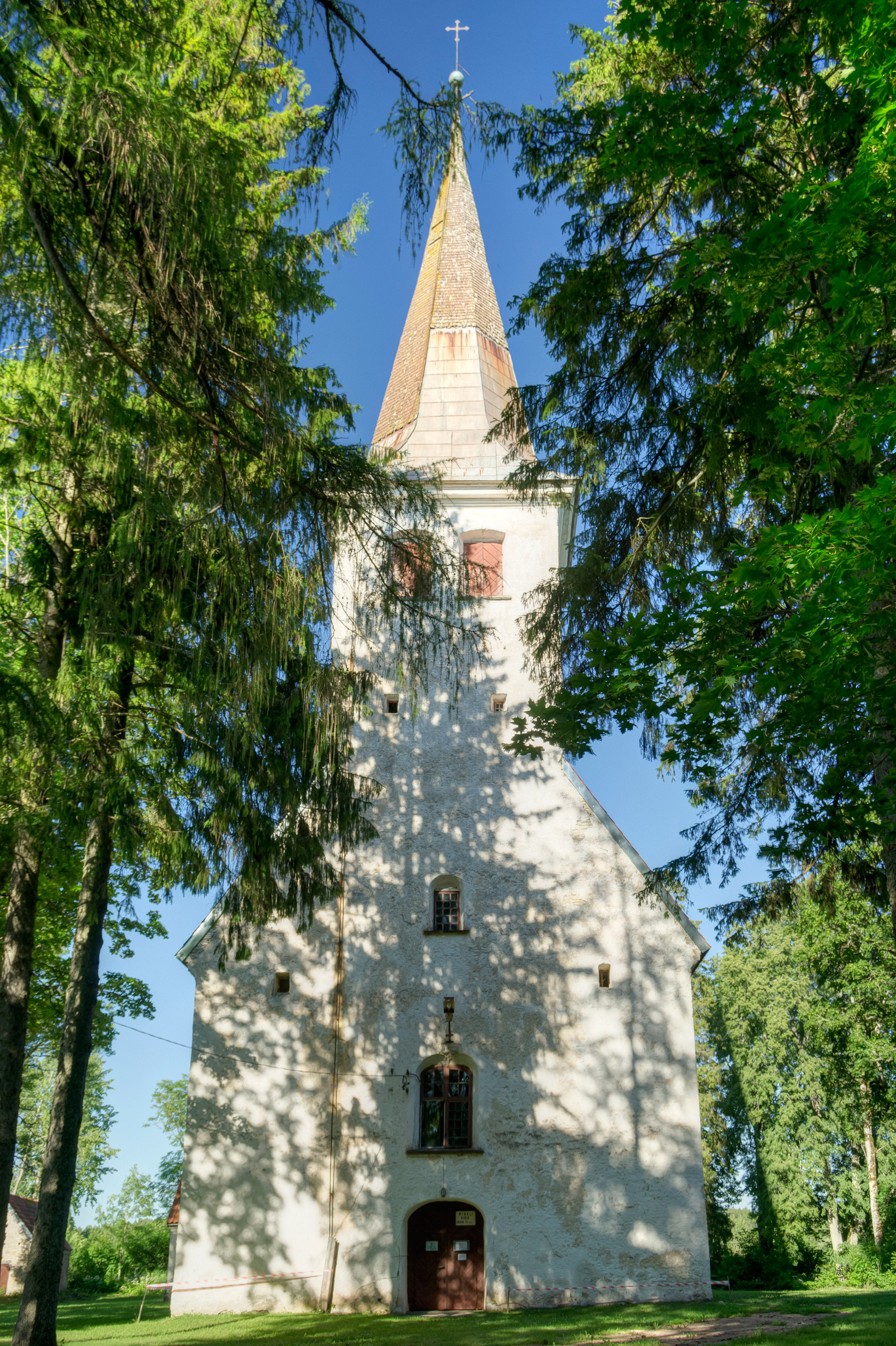
Estonian Evangelical Lutheran Church in Mihkli

Mihkli church is located in the village.

The first mentioning of the church dates back to the end of 13th century.

== See also ==
- Mihkli Nature Reserve
