= St Alexander's Church, Tartu =

Church building in Tartu, Estonia

St Alexander's Church
- The Parish Church of St Alexander Nevsky
- Tartu Püha Aleksandri kirik
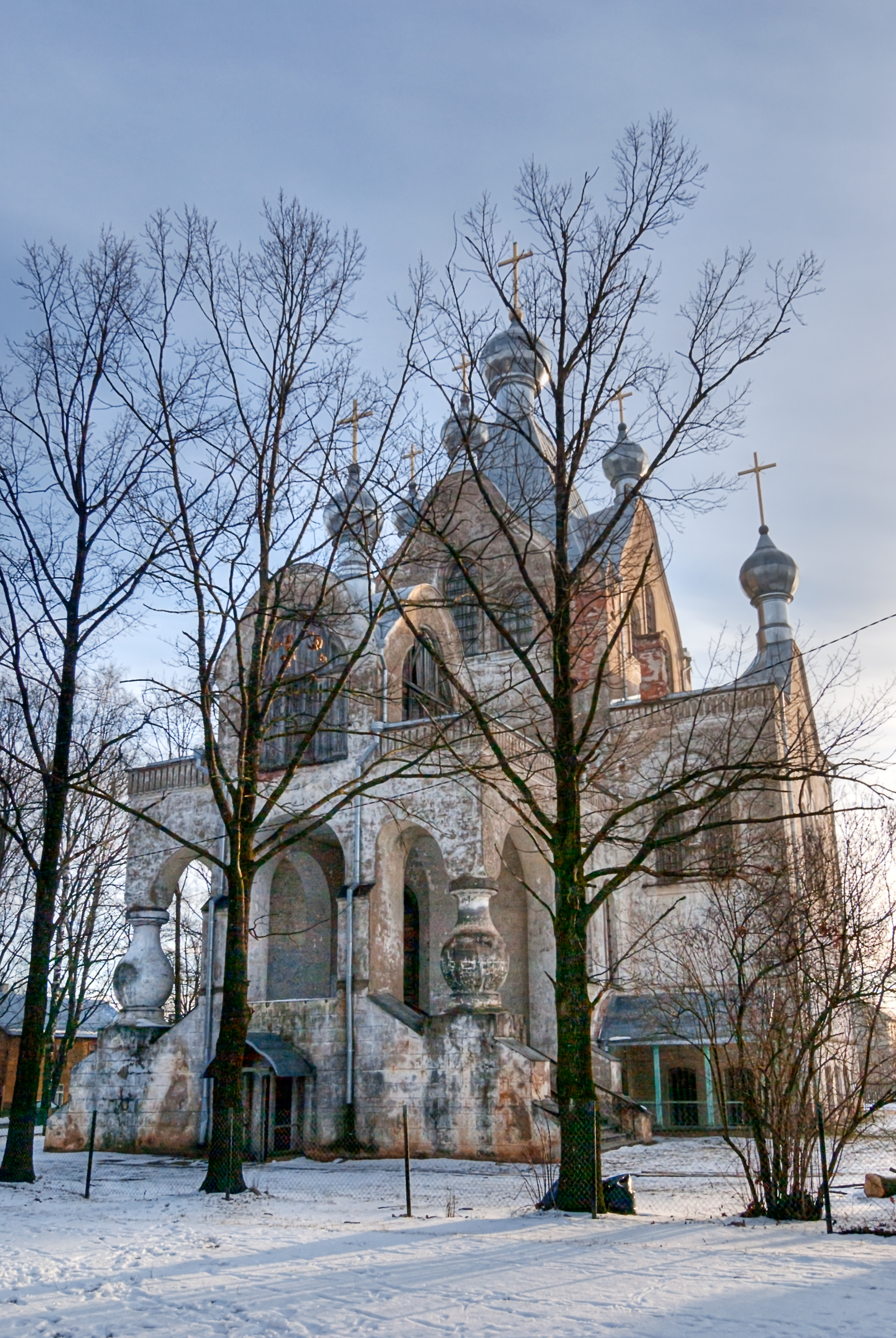
- St Alexander's Church
- 58.364489°N 26.728753°E
- Location: Tartu
- Country: Estonia
- Denomination: Estonian Apostolic Orthodox Church
- Website: Website of the church

History
- Status: Parish church
- Dedication: Alexander Nevsky

Architecture
- Functional status: Active
- Architect: Vladimir Lunski
- Style: Russian architecture
- Years built: 1914-1915
- Groundbreaking: 27 May 1914
- Completed: 15 August 1915

Administration
- Diocese: Tartu

Clergy
- Bishop: Elijah (Ott Ojaperv)
- Priest: Vadim Rebase

St Alexander's Church, formally known as The Parish Church of St Alexander Nevsky (Estonian: Tartu Püha Aleksandri kirik, Russian: Церковь Александра Невского) is a church of the Estonian Apostolic Orthodox Church in Tartu, Estonia.

== History ==
The cornerstone of the church was laid on 27 May 1914. The church was built in the Russian architecture on designs by Vladimir Lunski. The lower church was completed by the end of 1914 and was consecrated on 21 November. The church was used by the Russian and Estonian Orthodox congregations, though separately. The upper church was completed a year later and was consecrated on 26 September 1915.

== Soviet Occupation ==
In 1940 the church was nationalised by the Soviet authorities. For decades it was used as a warehouse by the State University of Tartu and later the National Museum of Ethnography of the Estonian SSR. The church was returned to the Estonian Apostolic Orthodox Church in 1995. The church was re-consecrated in the summer of 2003 by the parish priests Vadim Rebane and deacon Timothy Vasel.

== Gallery ==
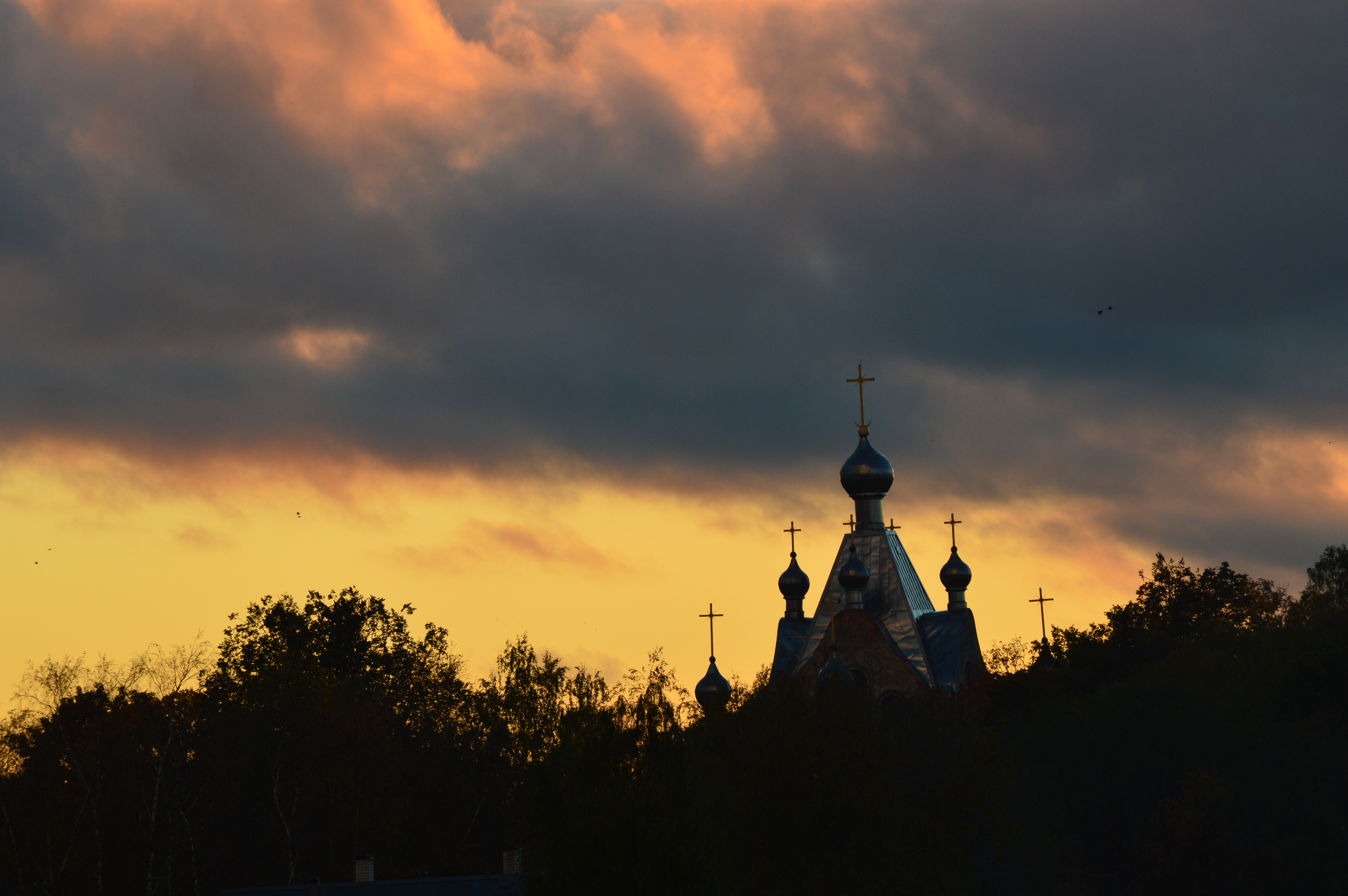
The Russian style domes

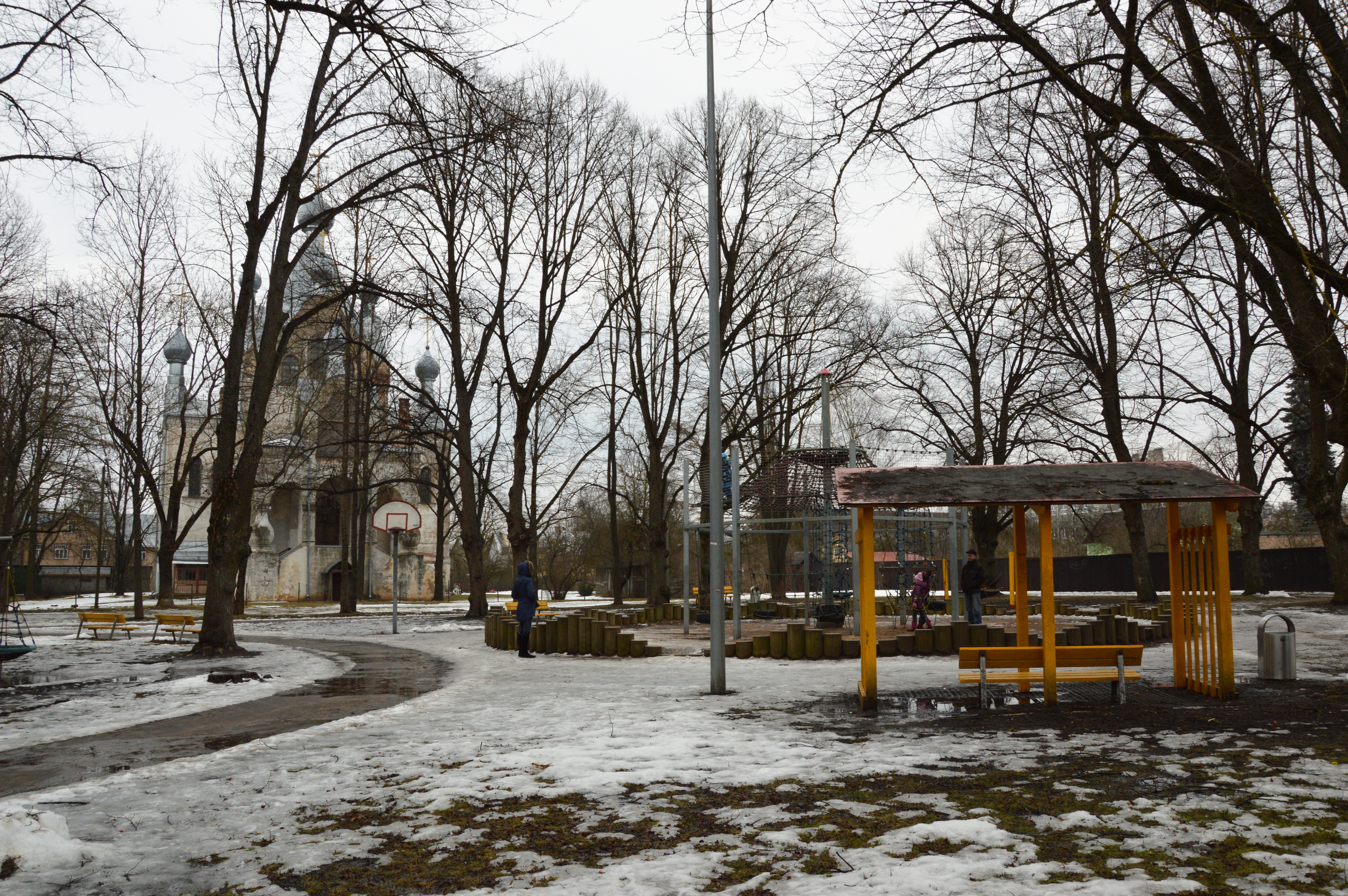
The church in 2016

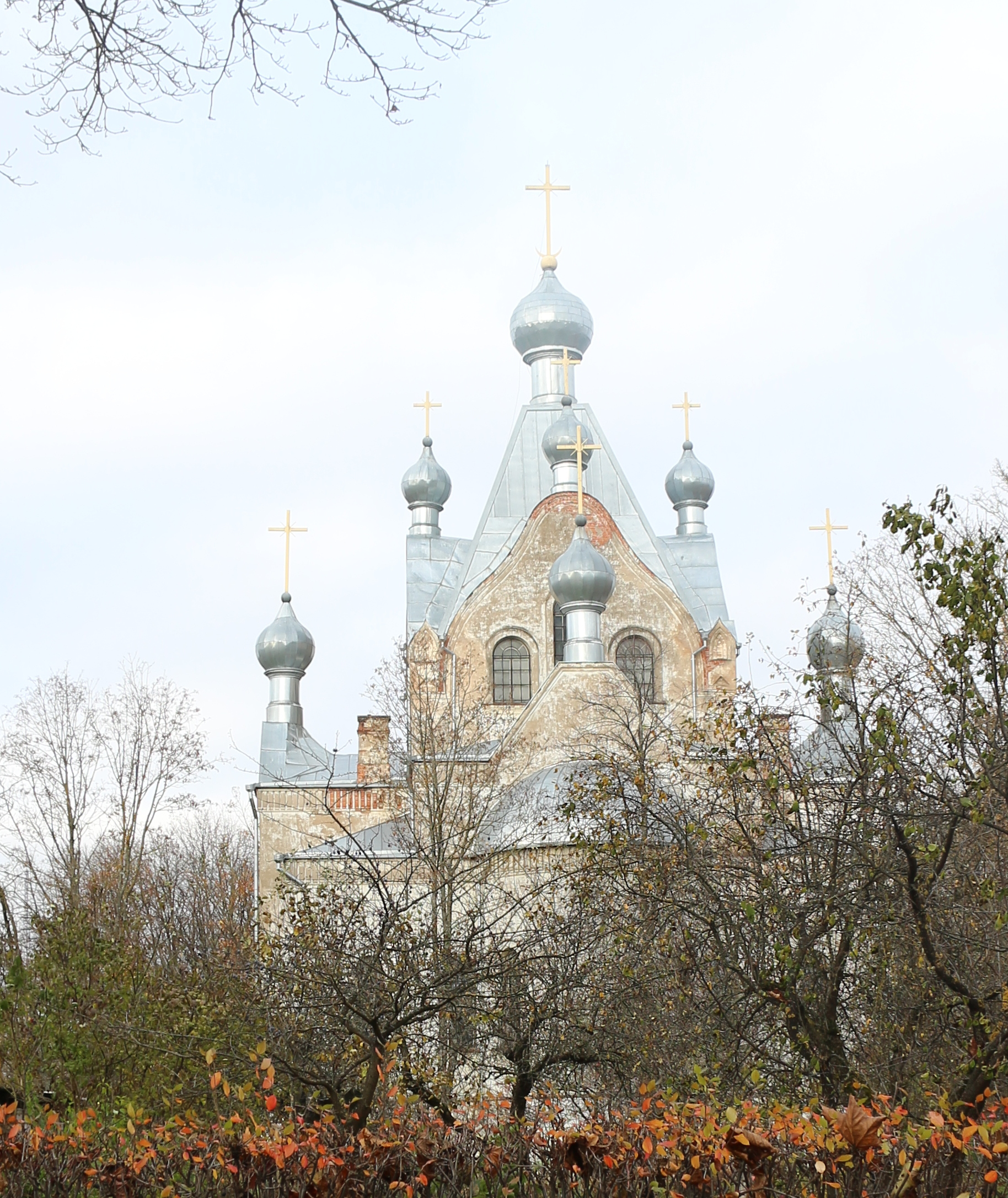
The church in 2013
