= Kolila =

Village in Estonia

Coordinates: 58°52′N 23°36′E

- Village
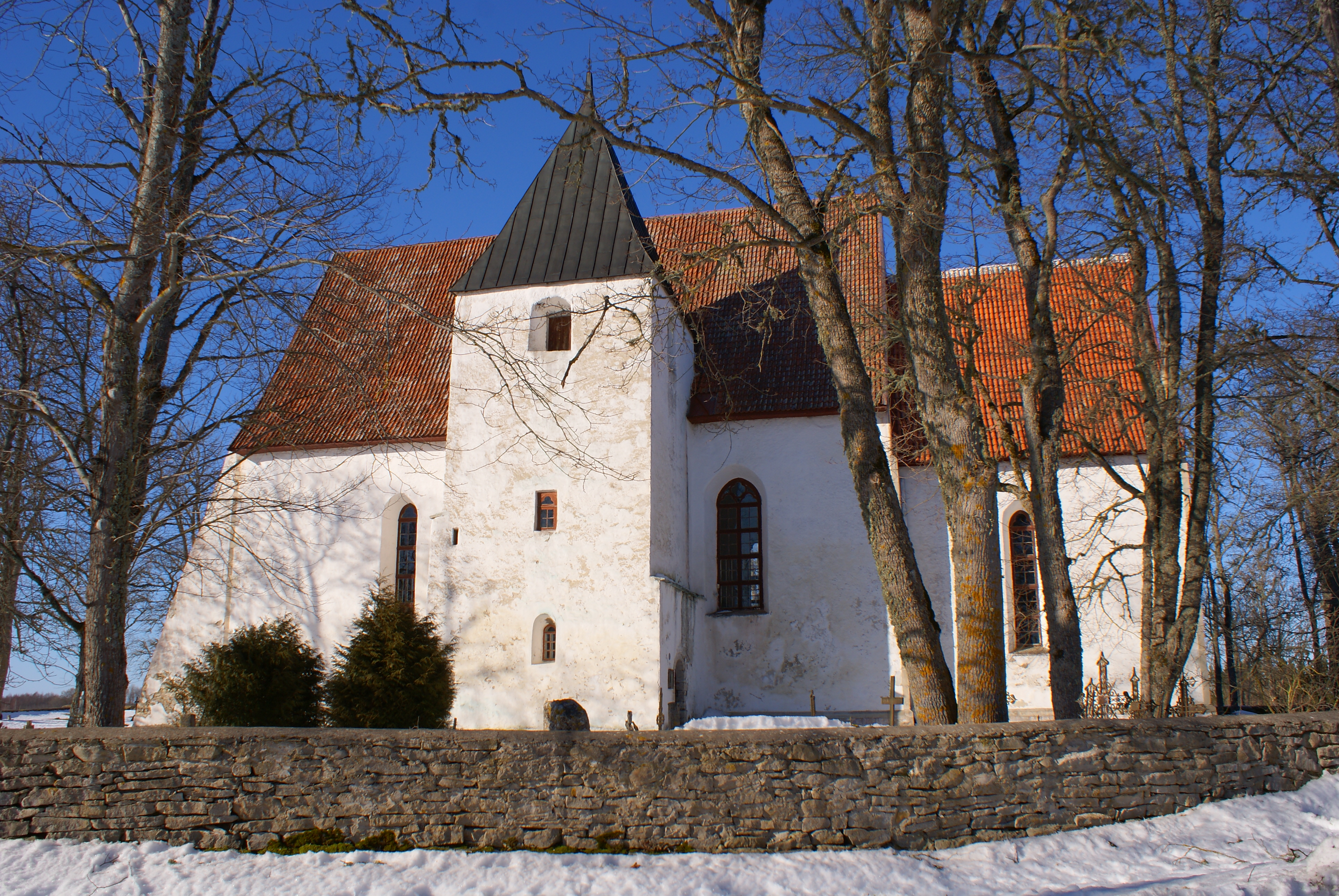
- Ridala church in Kolila village
- Interactive map of Kolila
- Country: Estonia
- County: Lääne County
- Municipality: Haapsalu
- Time zone: UTC+2 (EET)
  - Summer (DST): UTC+3 (EEST)

Kolila is a village in Haapsalu municipality, Lääne County, in western Estonia. Prior to the 2017 administrative reform of local governments, it was located in Ridala Parish.

== Ridala Church ==
Ridala Church in Kolila village is considered one of the most interesting churches in Lääne County, Estonia. It dates from the second half of the 13th century, with the tower added around 1500. In the 18th century, one of the vaults collapsed and a heavy buttress added on the western wall, to compensate the weight distribution. The church still retains its archaic, medieval atmosphere. The main west portal is finely sculpted and decorated with a sculpture of St. Mary Magdalene, one of the oldest surviving sculptures in Estonia. Inside, medieval mural painting survive, as do the noteworthy altar, triumphal cross and pulpit, which however all are of later date. Adjacent to the church is the graveyard with some of the graves dating from the 13th century.
