= Saint Magdalene Church, Ruhnu =

Wooden church in Estonia

Coordinates: 57°48′22″N 23°14′40″E

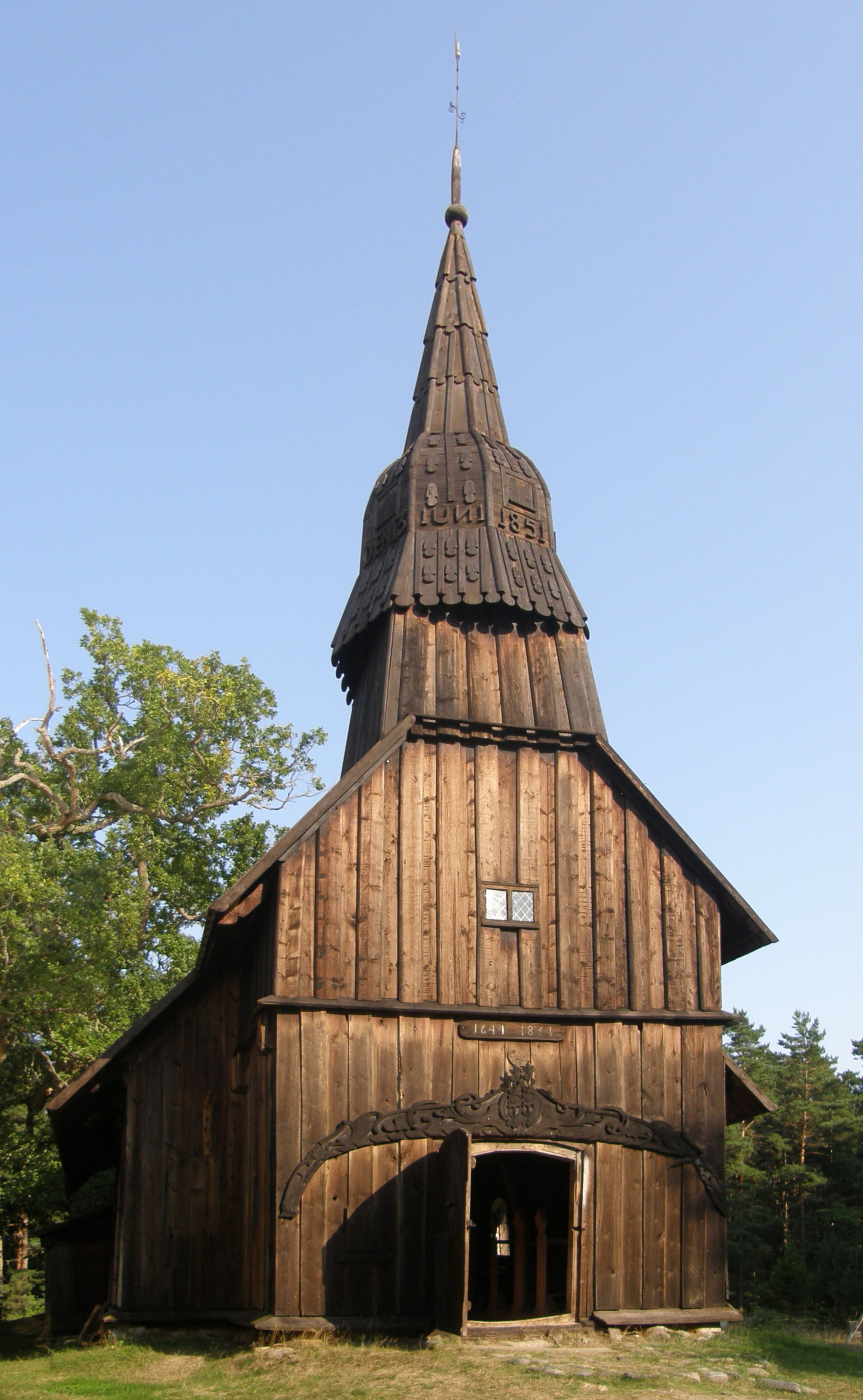
Ruhnu Wooden Church in 2011

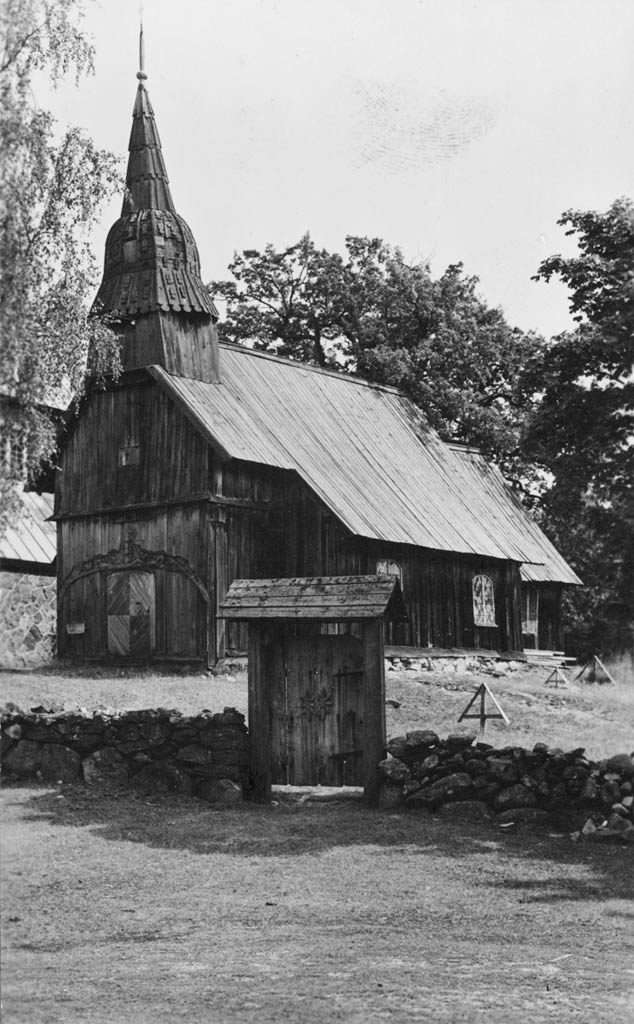
Ruhnu Wooden Church in 1920

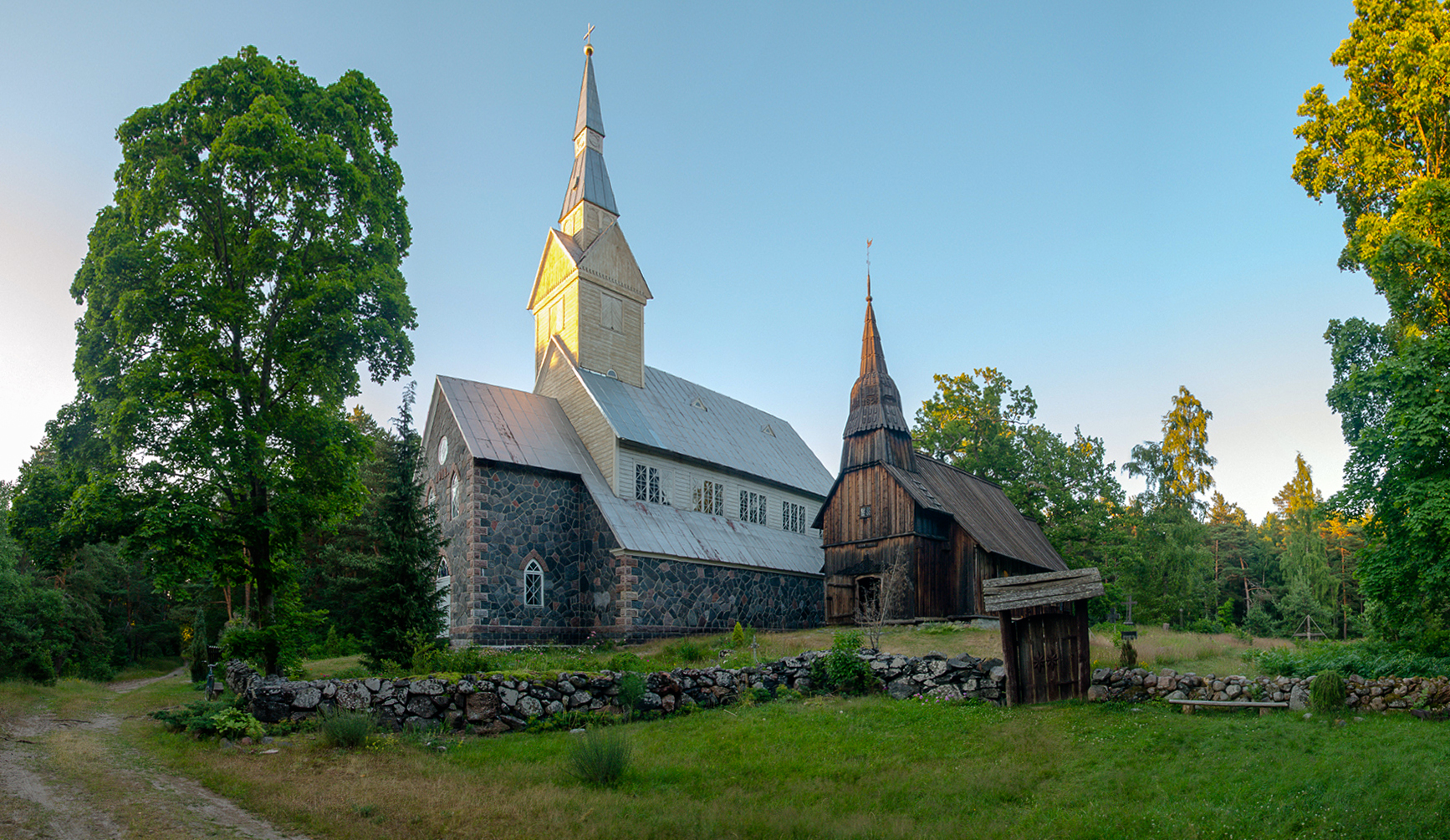
Ruhnu Wooden Church, and New Church in 2013

Saint Magdalene Church, Ruhnu (Estonian: Ruhnu Püha Magdaleena kirik), also known as Ruhnu Wooden Church (Estonian: Ruhnu puukirik) is a wooden church in Ruhnu Island, Estonia. It is the oldest preserved wooden shrine in Estonia. Architecturally, it is unique in Europe.

The church was built in 1643–1644.

Next to the wooden church is located Ruhnu New Church.
