= Leesi =

Village in Estonia

Coordinates: 59°36′13″N 25°30′00″E

- Village
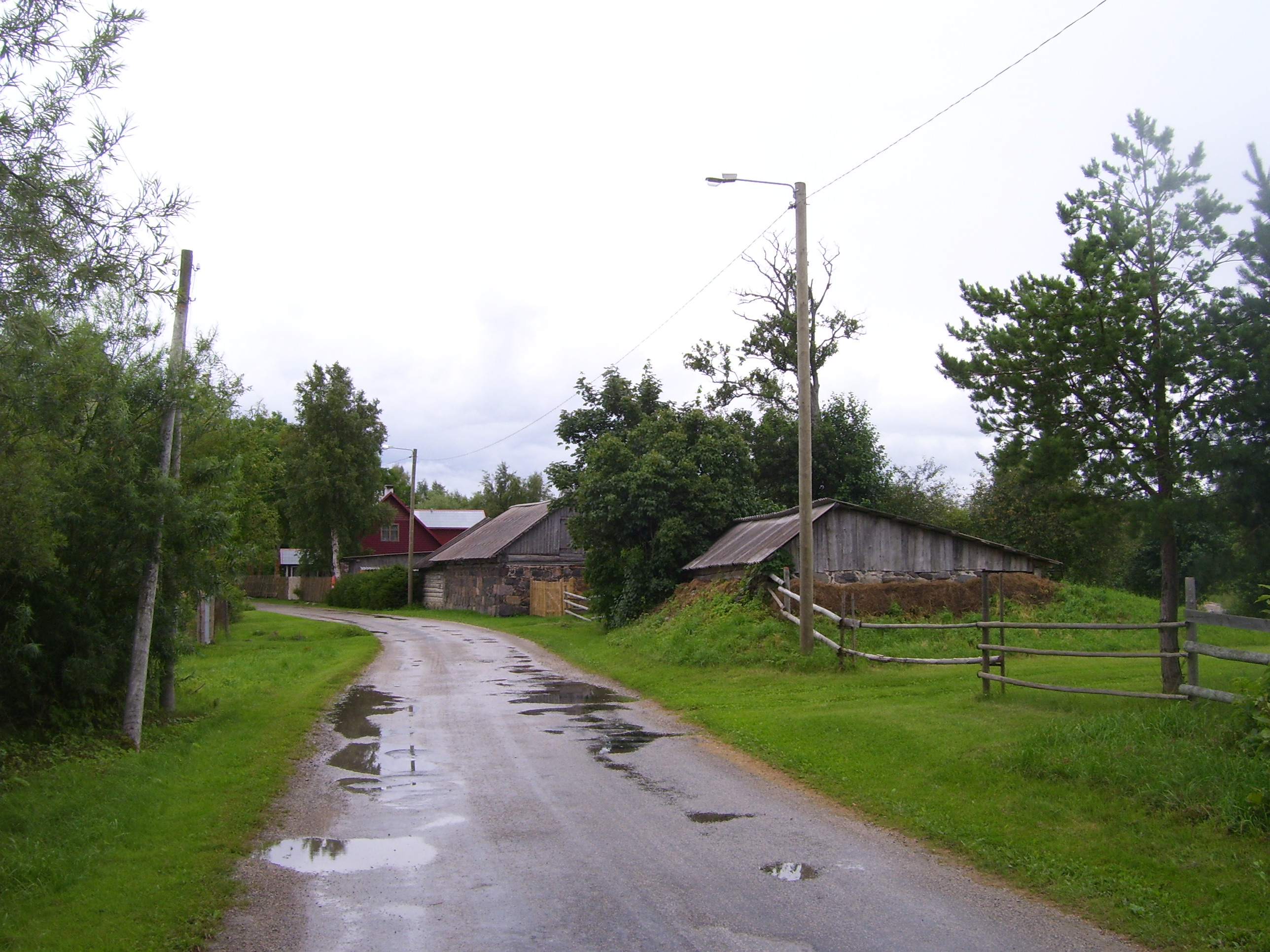
- Interactive map of Leesi
- Country: Estonia
- County: Harju County
- Parish: Kuusalu Parish
- Time zone: UTC+2 (EET)
  - Summer (DST): UTC+3 (EEST)

Leesi is a village in Kuusalu Parish, Harju County in northern Estonia, on the territory of Lahemaa National Park. It is located on the Juminda Peninsula.

== Gallery ==
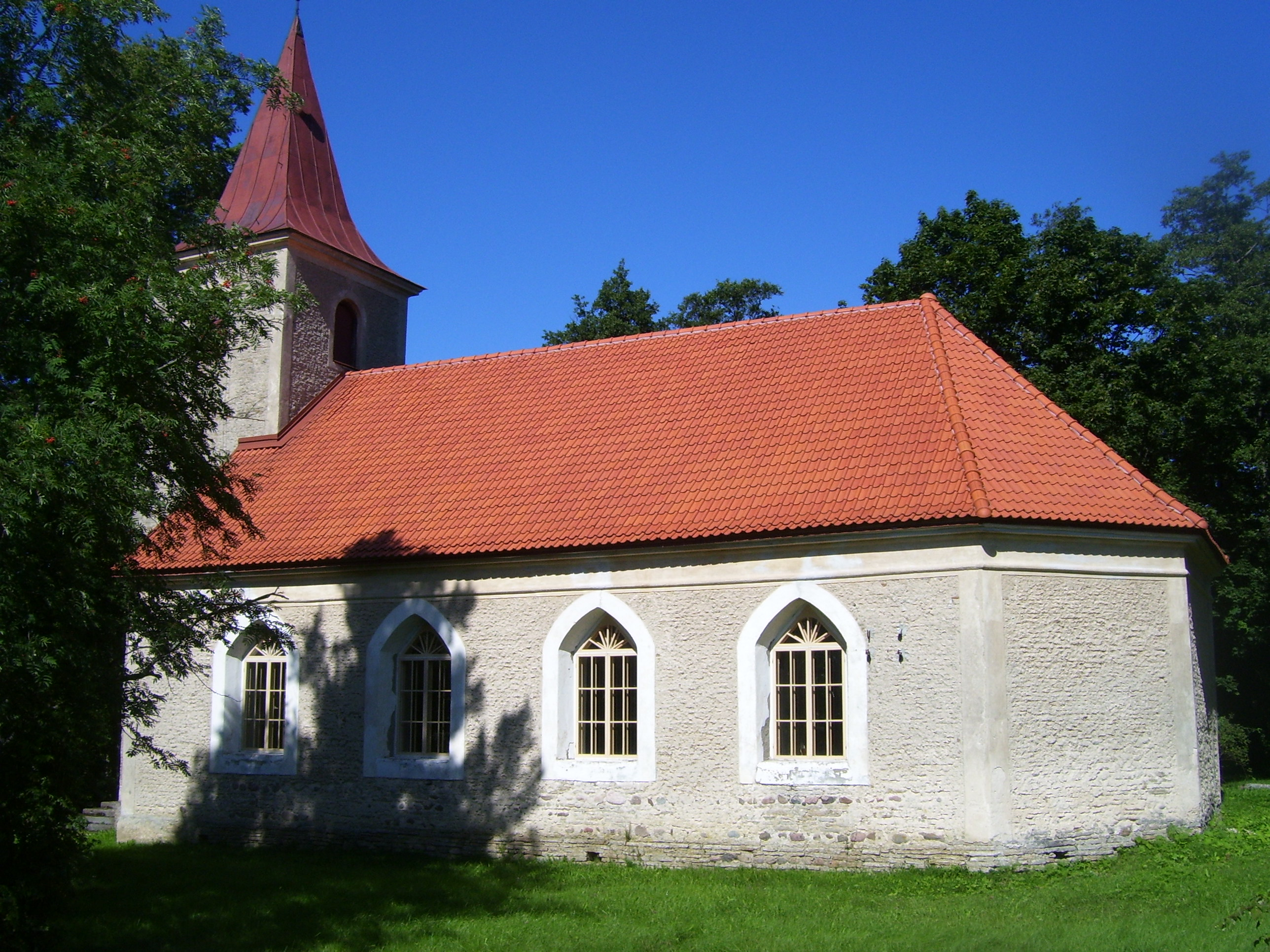
Leesi church

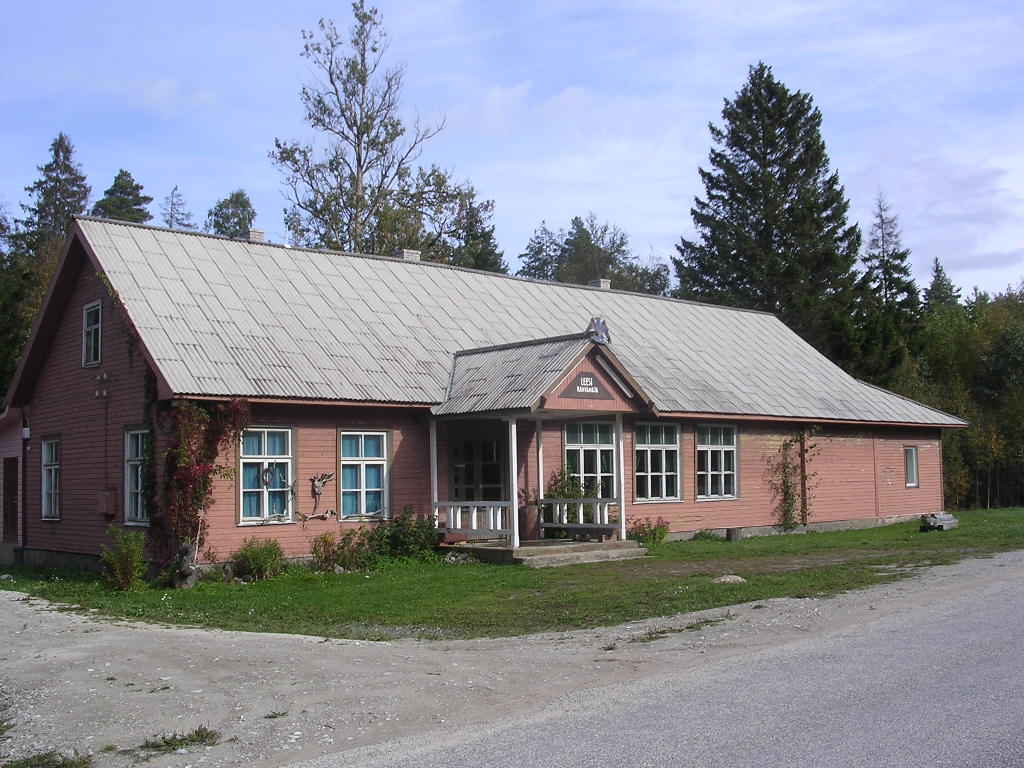
House of culture

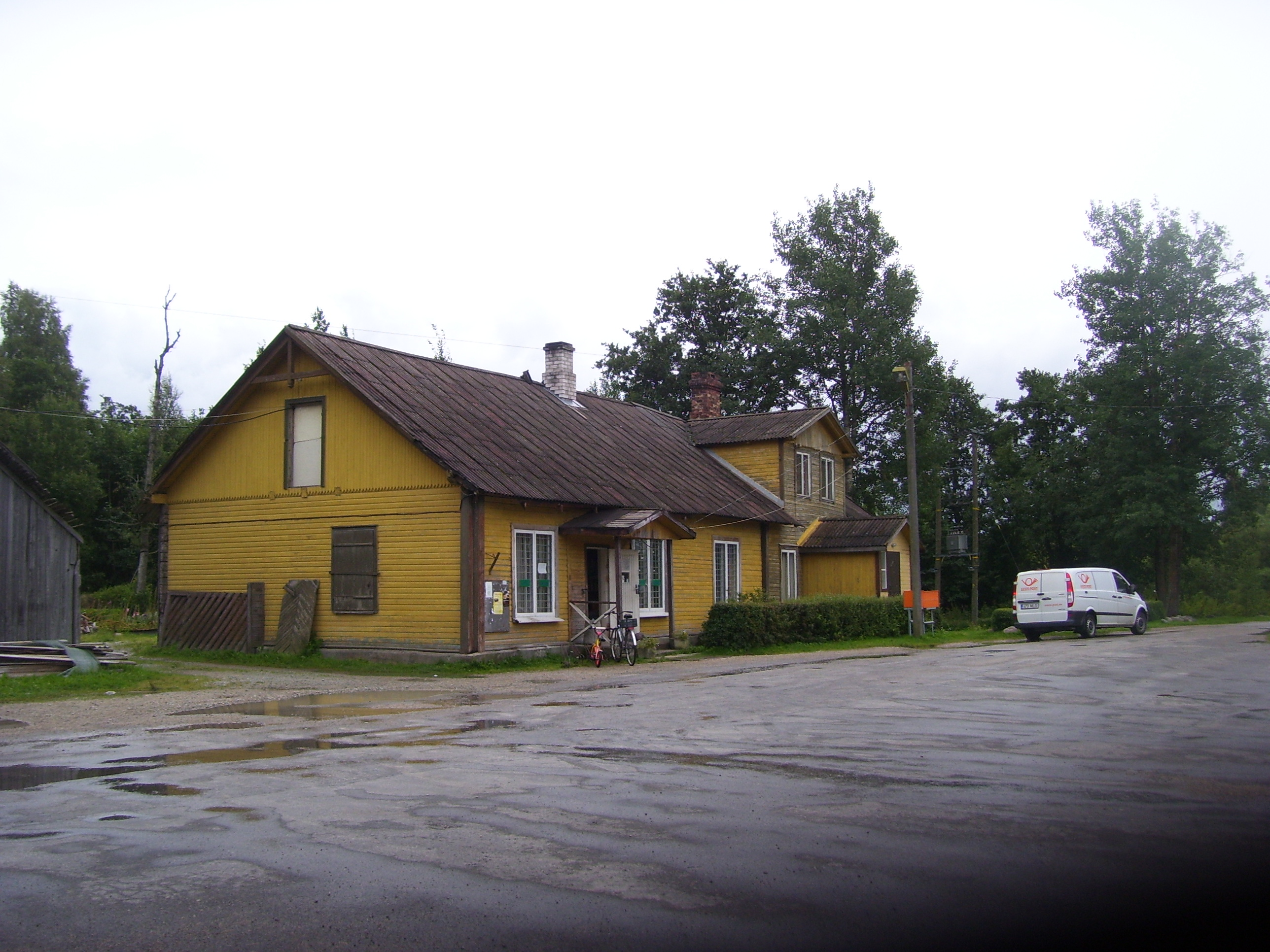
Store

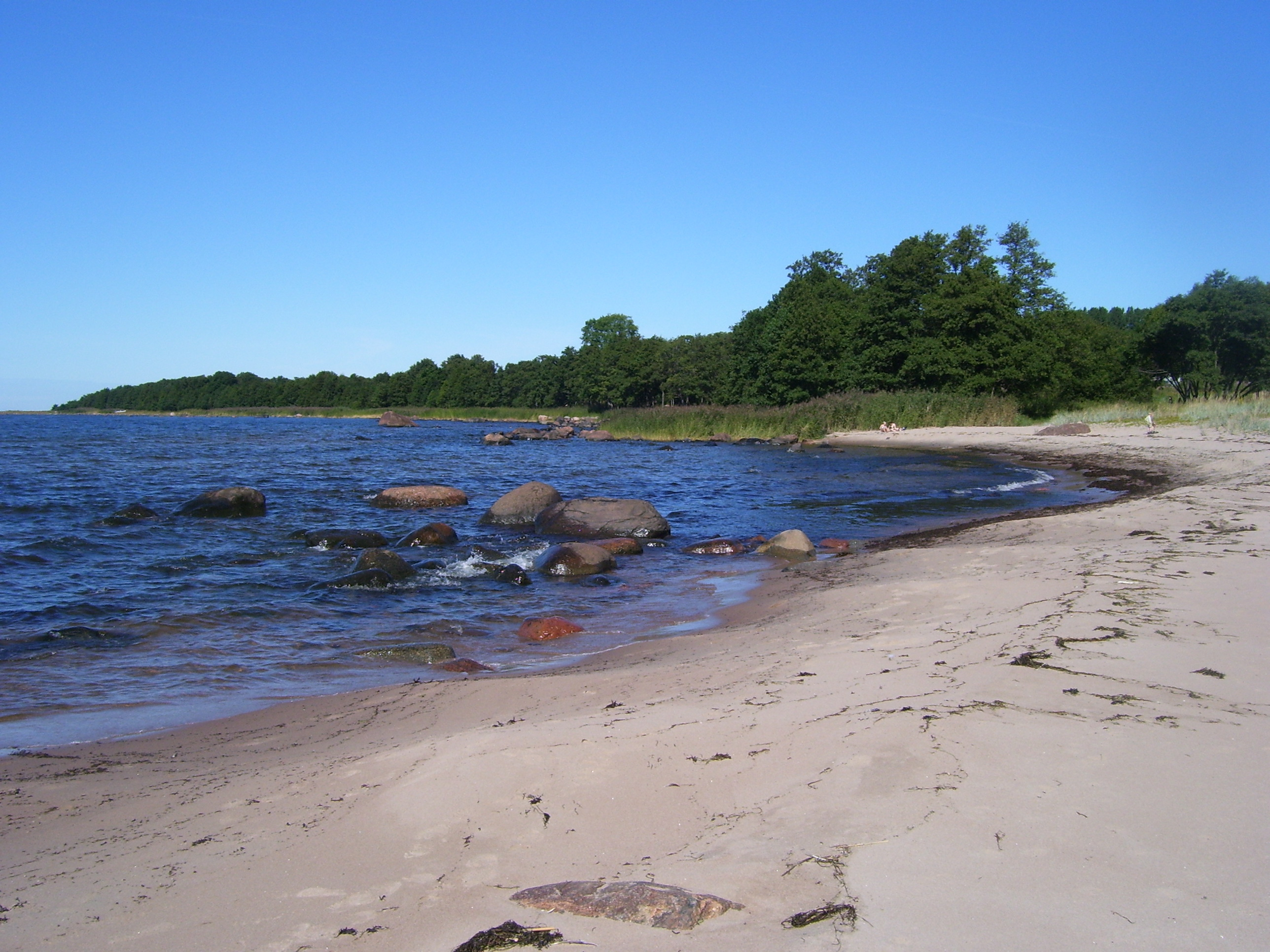
Beach in Leesi
