= Kuremäe =

Village in Estonia

Coordinates: 59°12′N 27°32′E

- Village
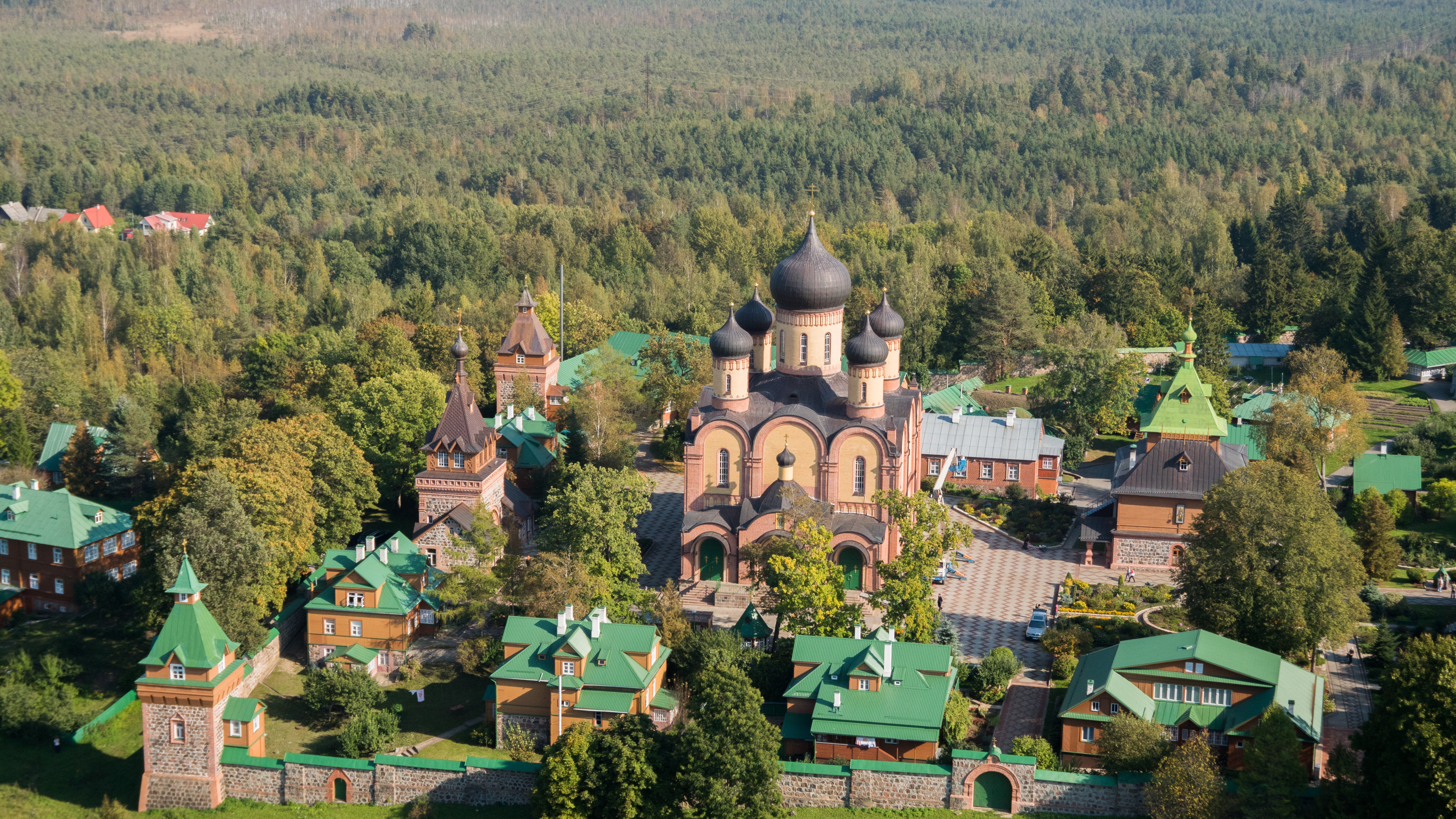
- Pühitsa Convent in Kuremäe
- Interactive map of Kuremäe
- Country: Estonia
- County: Ida-Viru County
- Parish: Alutaguse Parish
- Time zone: UTC+2 (EET)
  - Summer (DST): UTC+3 (EEST)

Kuremäe is a village in Alutaguse Parish, Ida-Viru County in northeastern Estonia.

== See also ==
- Pühtitsa Convent
