= St. George and St. Adalbert Church =

Church building in Estonia

Coordinates: 59°23′56.59″N 27°45′53.4″E

- Püha Jüri ja Püha Adalberti kirik
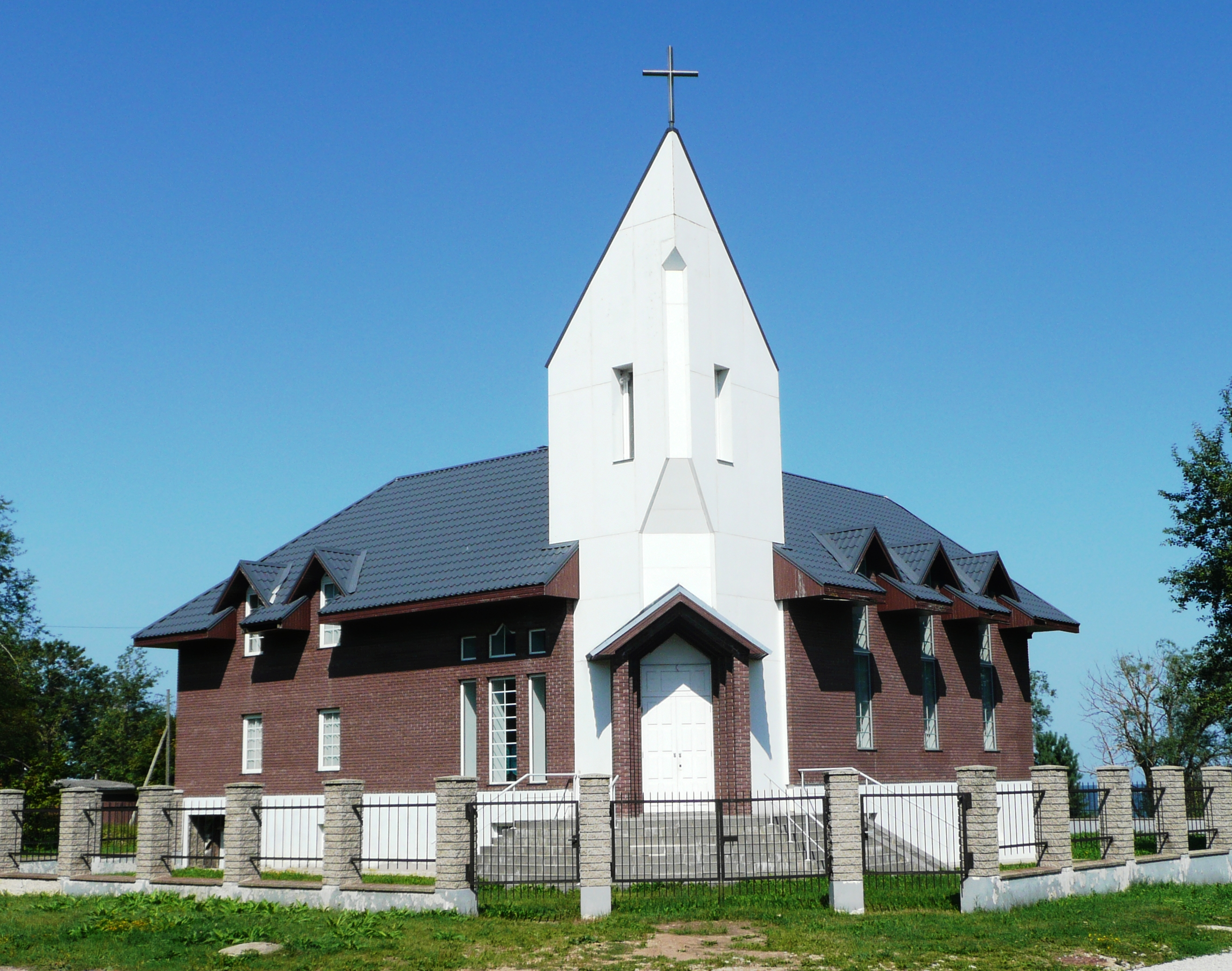
- St. George and St. Adalbert Church
- Location: Sillamäe
- Country: Estonia
- Denomination: Roman Catholic Church

The St. George and St. Adalbert Church (Estonian: Püha Jüri ja Püha Adalberti kirik) is the name given to a religious building of the Catholic Church located in Sillamäe a coastal city in Estonia, in Ida-Viru County (or Eastern Viru). As its name implies was dedicated to Saints George and Adalbert. This under the command of Father Grzegorz Senkowski and offers Mass in Russian and Polish due to which the congregation is composed of various nationalities present in Estonia.

== See also ==
- Roman Catholicism in Estonia
