= St. Catherine's Church, Pärnu =

Church building in Pärnu, Estonia

St. Catherine's Church
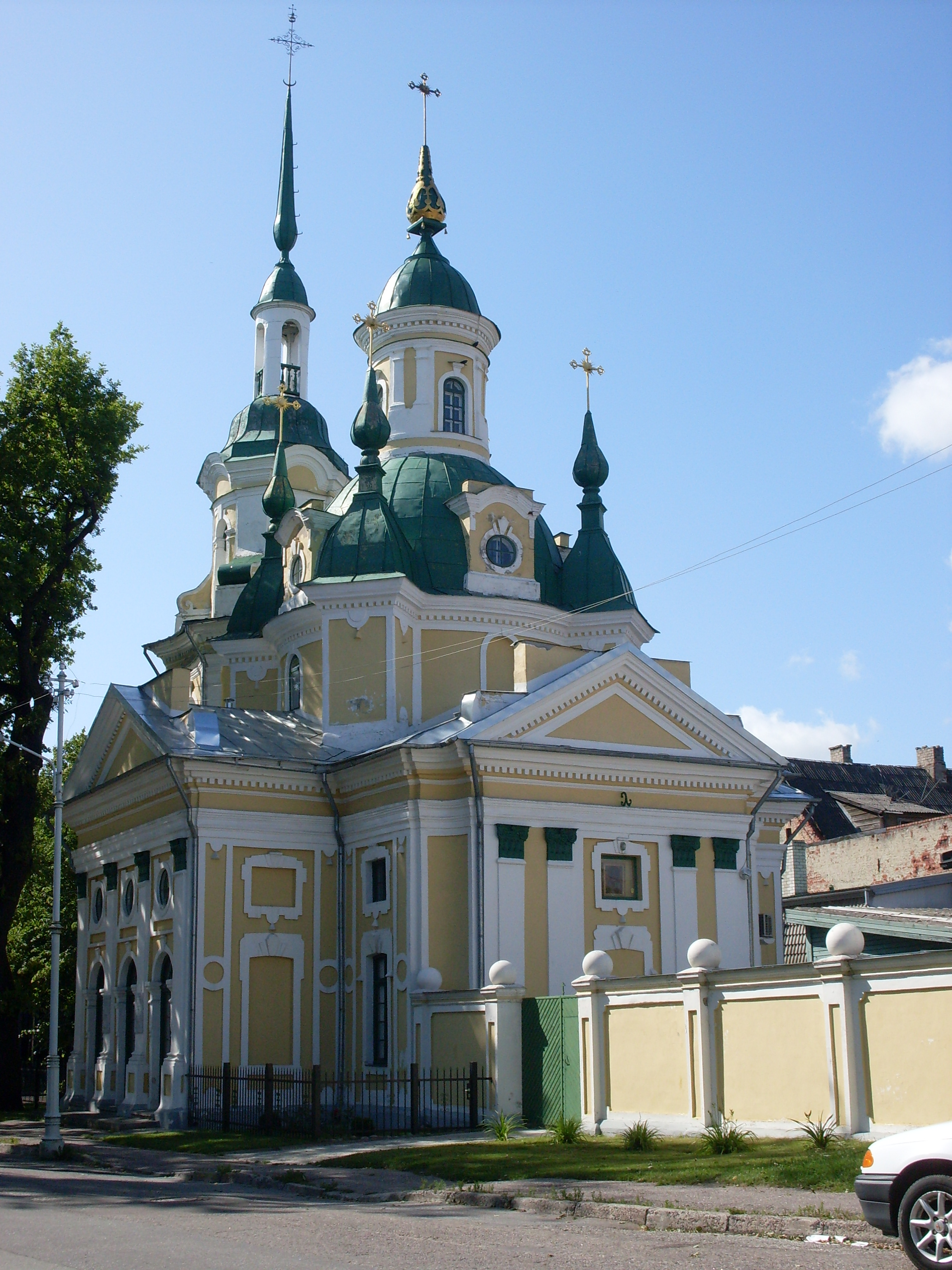
- St. Catherine's Church, Pärnu
- St. Catherine's Church
- 58°23′07″N 24°29′52″E
- Location: Pärnu
- Country: Estonia
- Denomination: Eastern Orthodox Church

History
- Consecrated: 1768

Architecture
- Architect: Pjotr Jegorov
- Style: Baroque

St. Catherine's Church, Pärnu (Estonian: Katariina kirik) is a Russian Orthodox church in Pärnu, Estonia.

The church was built in 1764-1768 and named after the empress, Catherine the Great, who presented the church to the city after a visit in 1764. It is built in a baroque style by architect P. Jegorov, and has been a source of inspiration for subsequent orthodox church architecture in the Baltic states. It displays a large central dome with a lantern, flanked by four smaller turrets and a western tower with a needle-pointed spire. The façade is rather lavishly decorated, divided by pediments and cornices. Inside, the iconostasis, also by Jegorov, is noteworthy.
