= Pühalepa =

Village in Estonia

- Village
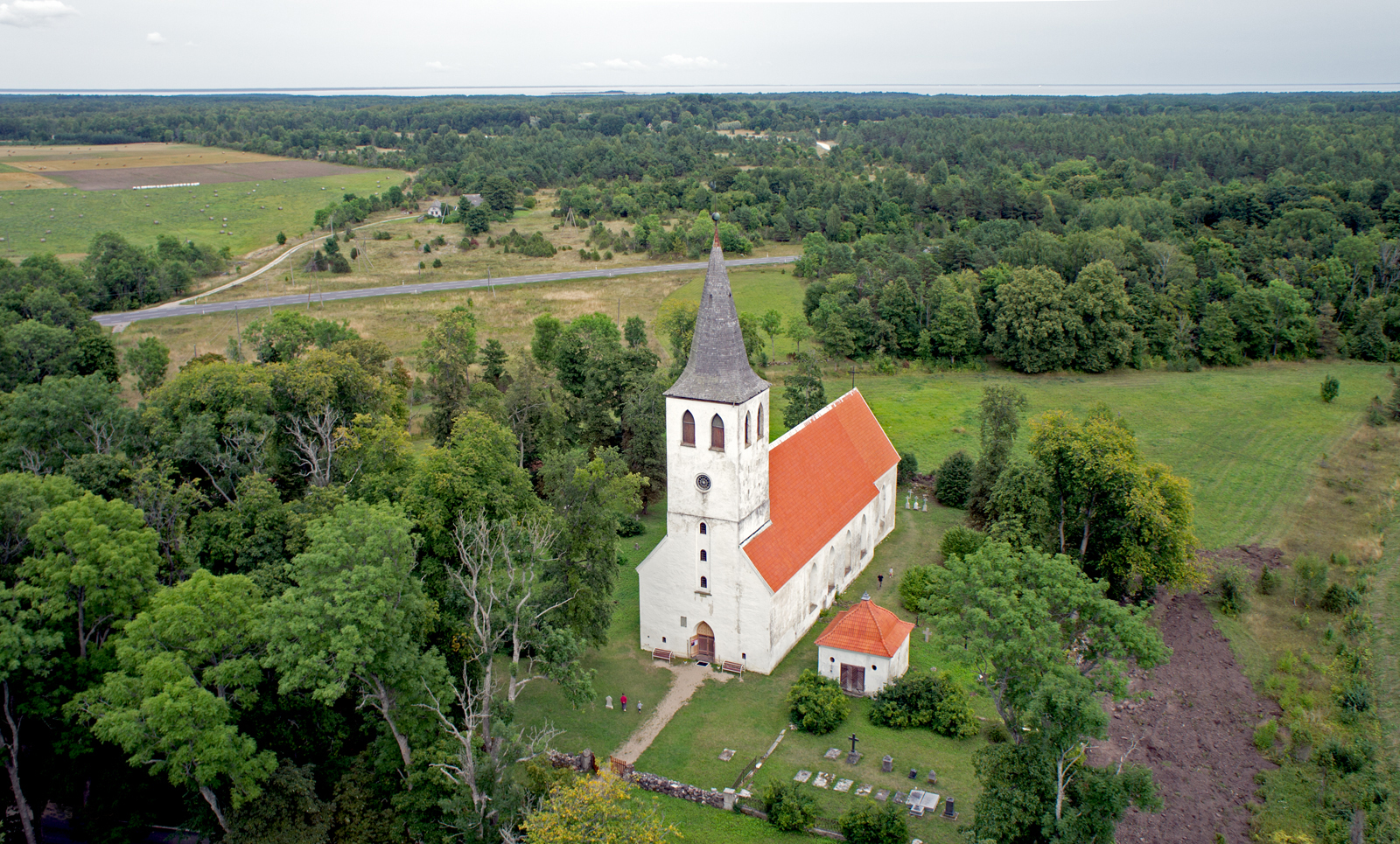
- Church in Pühalepa

- Location within Estonia
- Coordinates: 58°52′N 22°59′E
- Country: Estonia
- County: Hiiu County
- Parish: Hiiumaa Parish
- Time zone: UTC+2 (EET)
  - Summer (DST): UTC+3 (EEST)

Pühalepa (German: Pühhalep) is a village in Hiiumaa Parish, Hiiu County in northwestern Estonia.

== Pühalepa Church ==
Pühalepa Church (historically St. Lawrence Church) is the oldest surviving stone church on the island of Hiiumaa. It is a medieval fortress-church built in the 13th century, surrounded by a historic churchyard and several notable family burial plots. The steeple was added much later. Its tower and interior fittings were later modified in the 19th century, renovations including the painting of Crosses of Malta on the walls, primarily associated with the Ungern-Sternberg family. A notable interior object is a dolomite pulpet dated 1636, carved from stone.

== Gallery ==
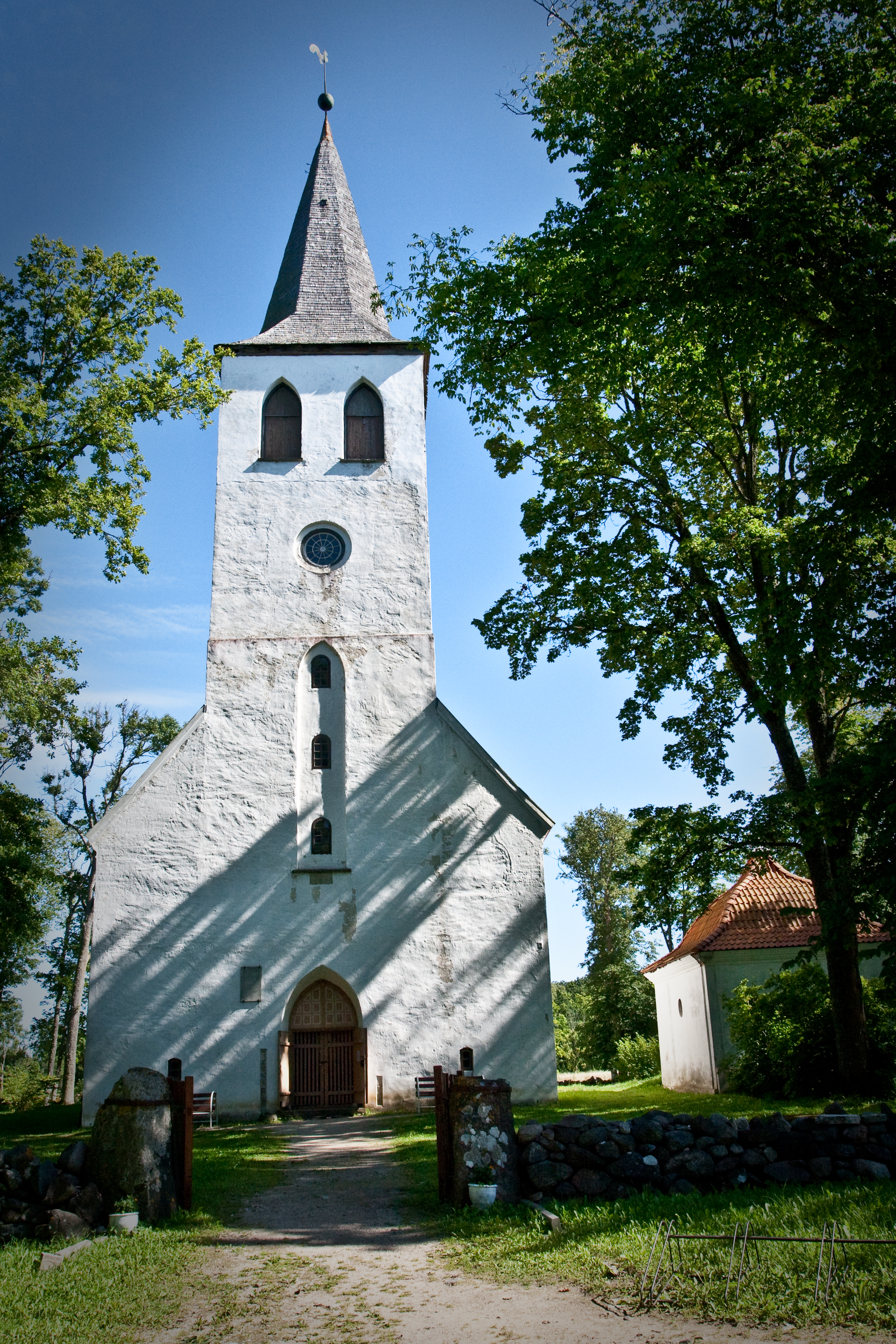
Pühalepa Church

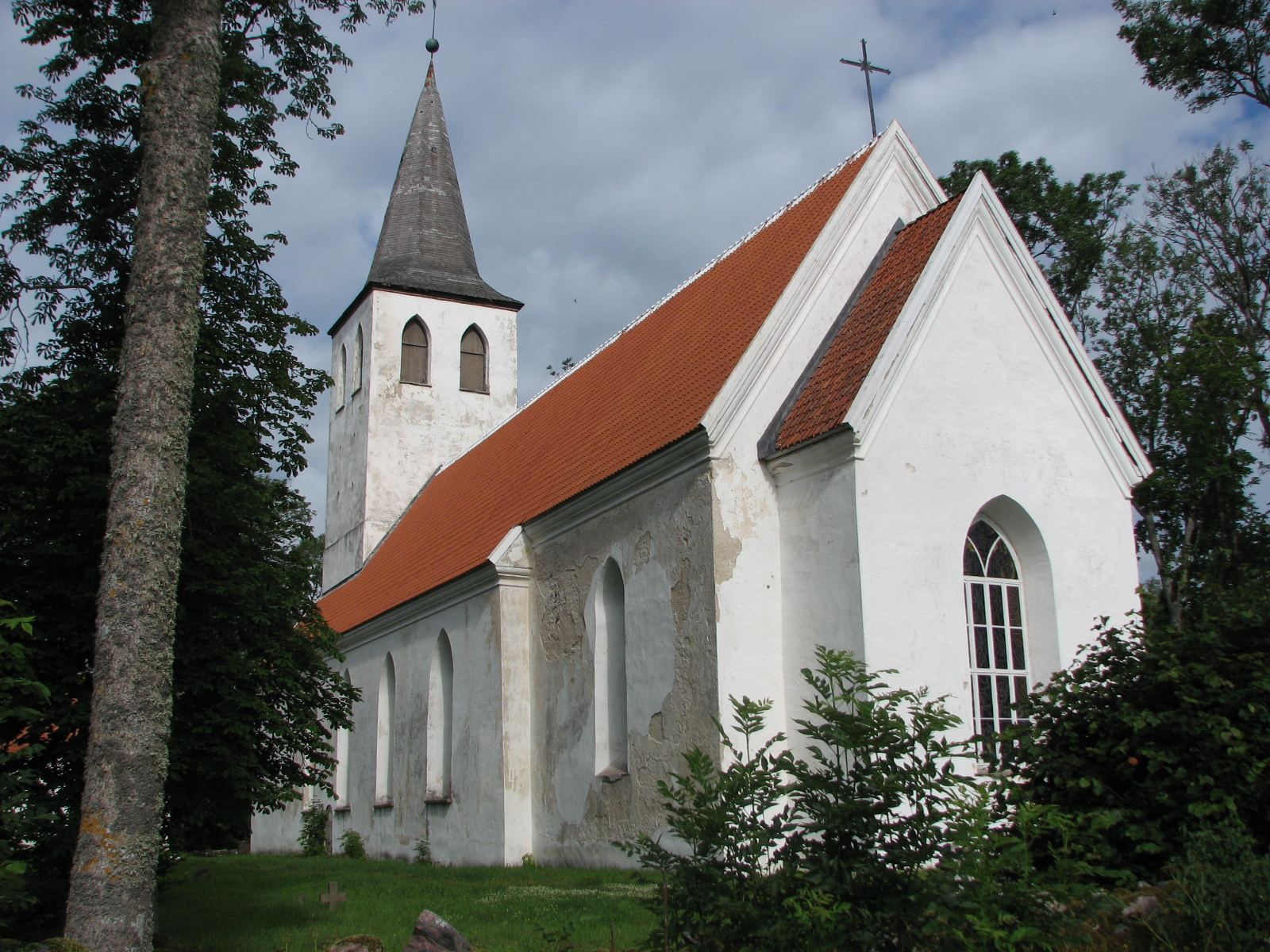

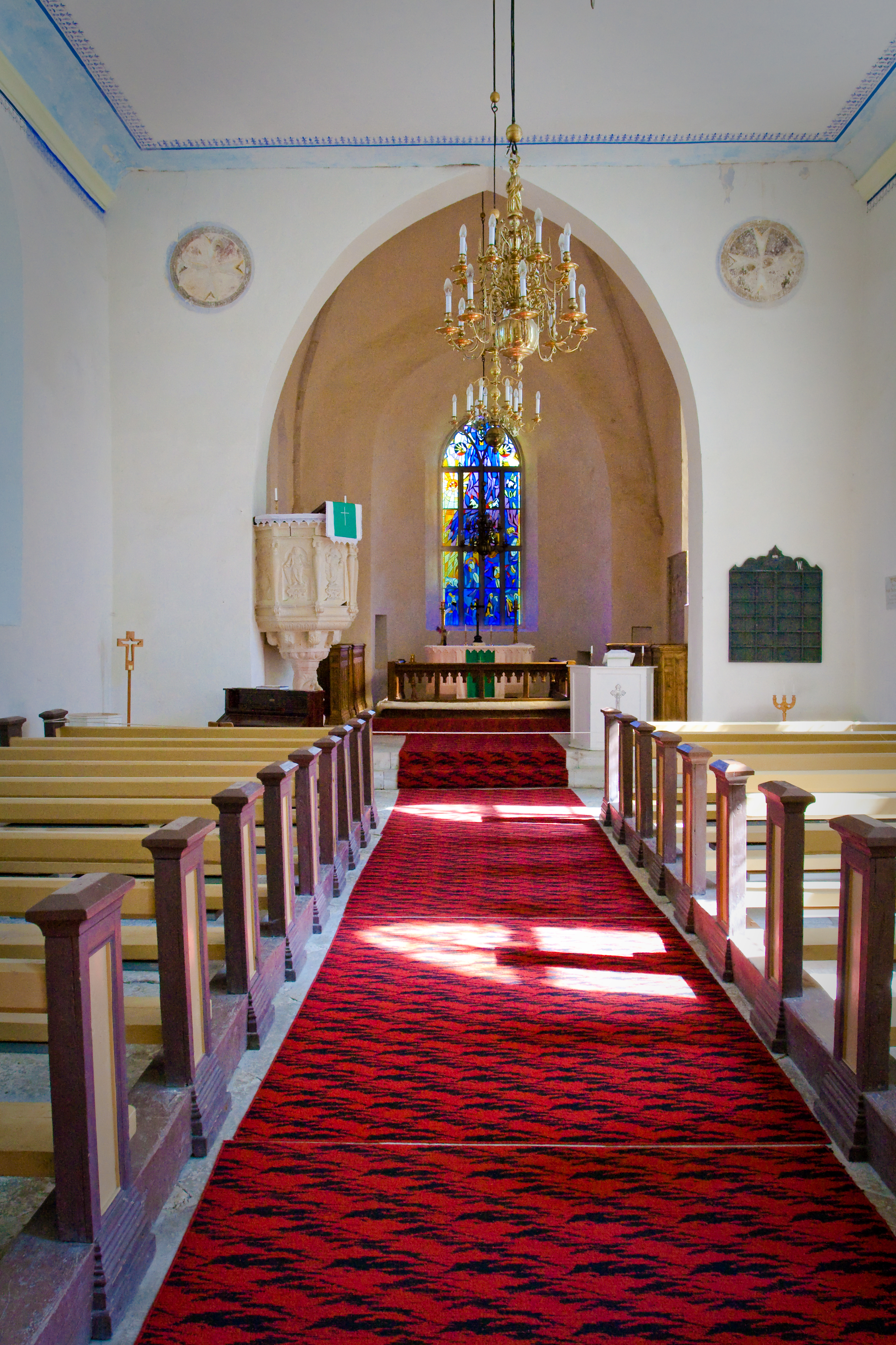

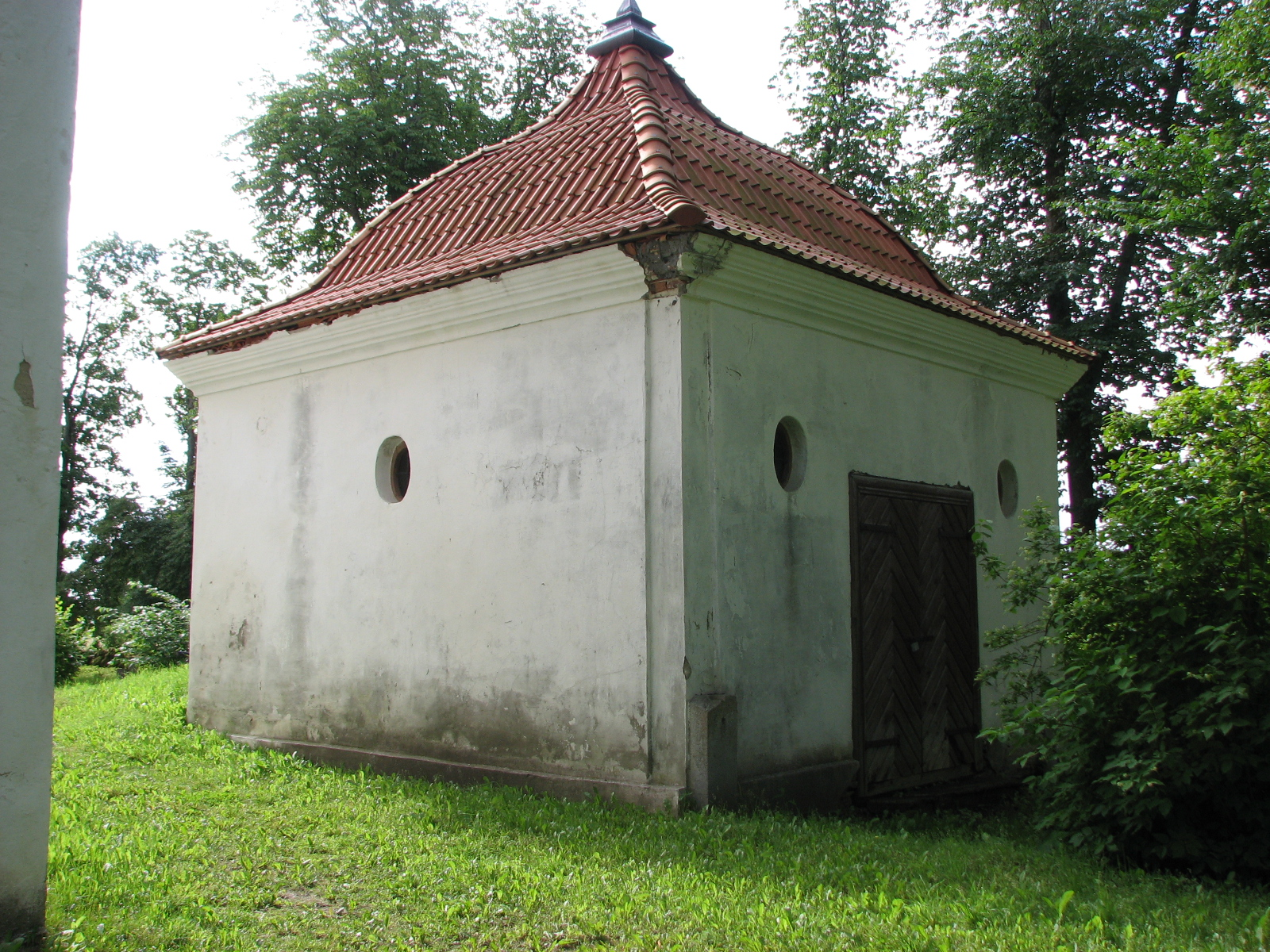
Ebba-Margaretha Stenbock's burial chapel in the churchyard.
