= John of Kronstadt =

Russian saint

Saint John of Kronstadt
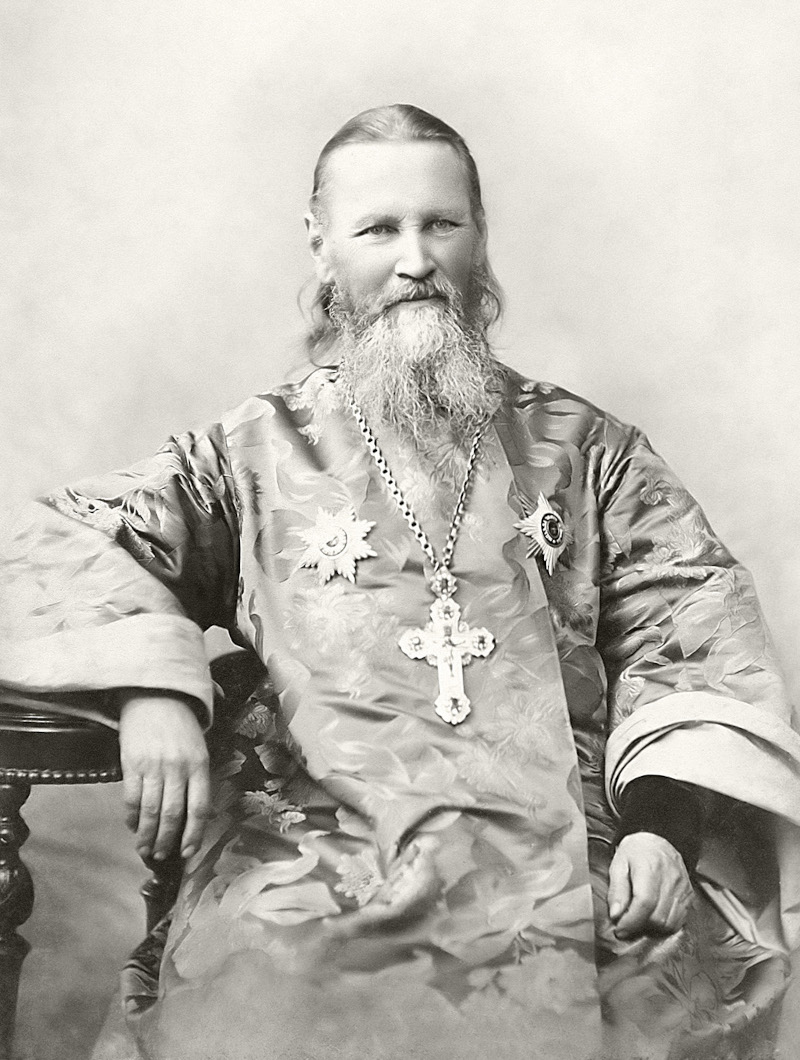
- John in priestly vestments, c. 1900

Righteous
- Born: Ivan Ilyich Sergiyev; 31 October [O.S. 19 October] 1829; Sura, Pinezhsky Uyezd, Arkhangelsk Governorate, Russian Empire
- Residence: Kronstadt
- Died: 2 January 1909 [O.S. 20 December 1908] Kronstadt, Saint Petersburg Governorate, Russian Empire
- Venerated in: Eastern Orthodox Church
- Canonized: 1 November 1964, and 1990 by Russian Orthodox Church Outside Russia and Russian Orthodox Church, respectively
- Major shrine: Ioannovsky Convent, Saint Petersburg, Russia
- Patronage: sick people; children with learning difficulties; people in a desperate situation; those who struggle with alcohol and drug addiction; those who have raising children difficulties; Kronstadt and Saint Petersburg
- Influenced: Cyril Smirnov, Seraphim Chichagov, John of Shanghai and San Francisco

John of Kronstadt or John Iliytch Sergieff (pre-reform Russian: Іоаннъ Кронштадтскій; post-reform Russian: Иоанн Кронштадтский; 31 October [O.S. 19 October] 1829 – 2 January 1909 [O.S. 20 December 1908]) was a Russian Orthodox archpriest and a member of the Most Holy Synod of the Russian Orthodox Church. He was known for his mass confessions, numerous miracles, and charitable work, as well as his monarchistic and anti-communist views.

John is a saint of the Eastern Orthodox Church and is known with the epithet "Righteous".

== Early life ==
The future Saint was born as Ivan Ilyich Sergiyev (pre-reform Russian: Иванъ Ильичъ Сергіевъ; post-reform Russian: Иван Ильич Сергиев) on 31 October [O.S. 19 October] 1829 in the northern village of Sura, near the White Sea, in Arkhangelsk Governorate, Russian Empire. He came from a hereditary corporation of village clergymen, and his father was a poor dyachok in the local church. The little that is known about his early life is mainly from late memories. In his autobiography, he claims that his parents gave him to a parish school but that the study was too difficult for him. However, he prayed earnestly and received inspiration. He became the top student in the school and then in the seminary, which enabled him to enter the Theological Academy in Saint Petersburg, the Russian capital. He became the 35th out of 39 students who graduated from the academy in 1855.

== "Kronstadt Father" ==
From 1855, he worked as a priest in Saint Andrew's Cathedral in Kronstadt, the naval base near St. Petersburg. He married the 26-year-old daughter of the archpriest of the cathedral. Benjamin (Fedchenkov) (1880–1961) writes that after the marriage, he surprisingly refused to have sexual relations with his wife, despite her complaints to the church authorities. Their niece Rufina lived with John and Elizabeth.

The young priest behaved unusually:

- He walked along the street and constantly prayed and crossed his arms on his chest.
- He tried to serve the liturgy every day.
- During the service, he behaved very expressively, deviated from the usual text and turned his back to the altar.
- He introduced the practice of frequent Confession and Holy Communion although once or twice a year was then usual.
- He allowed the easing from some requirements for the Communicant (in particular, he allowed women during menstruation to communicate, which was usually forbidden).

Not everyone perceived his innovations positively, especially church authorities. His biographer Nadieszda Kizenko notes that some aspects of John's behaviour were reminiscent of the practices of Protestants and others of the Khlysts. Nevertheless, his distinctive style attracted attention to the young priest and allowed him to show his charisma. John was widely venerated as a saint even during his lifetime because of his fame as a powerful prayer, healer, and visionary.

John established a special relief organization. It was called the "House of the Industry" and opened in Kronstadt in 1882. It had its own church, an elementary school for boys and girls, an orphanage, a hospital for anyone who came there, a boarding house, a free public library, shelter for the homeless that accommodated 40,000 people each year, a variety of workshops in which the impoverished could earn some money, a cheap public canteen that served about 800 free dinners on holidays and a hostel for the travelers.

By the early 1890s, John had become well known, and people from all over Russia came to him every day in thousands. He practiced mass confessions during which thousands of people wiped out their sins and went into a frenzy, which was often accompanied by hysterics and tears. John came to a wide prominence after the publication of an open letter in the newspaper Novoe Vremya (literally New Time) in 1883. The publication was also a turning point in the relationship between John and his church authorities. In the open letter, 16 people told about their healing thanks to the prayers of John and swore, "Now live according to God's truth and go to Holy Communion as often as possible". Such a publication in a secular newspaper violated the rules under which the religious censor had to preapprove the article, and it was perceived by the church hierarchy as interference into its affairs and a violation of subordination by John. The church did not know what to do with a person who suddenly claimed to be a living wonderworker with healing power (only relics were thought to have that power). The situation was discussed by the highest church organ, the Most Holy Synod, whose hierarchs were in disarray, and Metropolitan Isidore, John's direct supervisor, was especially dissatisfied.

In 1894, Tsar Alexander III of Russia summoned John to Livadia Palace, in the Crimea, as Alexander lay dying of kidney disease. While John claimed he had raised the dead previously, he failed to heal the Tsar by his prayers. However, after the invitation to the bed of a dying tsar, John became immune to the criticism of church authorities.

In 1903, The Kentucky Post, an American newspaper, reported on a letter attributed to John of Kronstadt addressed to Macedonian Christians, who at the time were suffering under Ottoman oppression. The letter referred to Macedonia as "the cradle of Slavs and Orthodoxy" and expressed hope for its liberation from "infidels," urging the people to "believe in God and Russia." The report warned that the message might provoke a "holy war," reflecting how John's religious authority was perceived as influential not only in Russia but also across Orthodox Christian populations in the Balkans.

In the fall of 1907, John was appointed by Tsar Nicholas II as a member of the Holy Synod, but John did not participate in any meeting of the Holy Synod because of his serious illness.

== Support for Russian far right ==
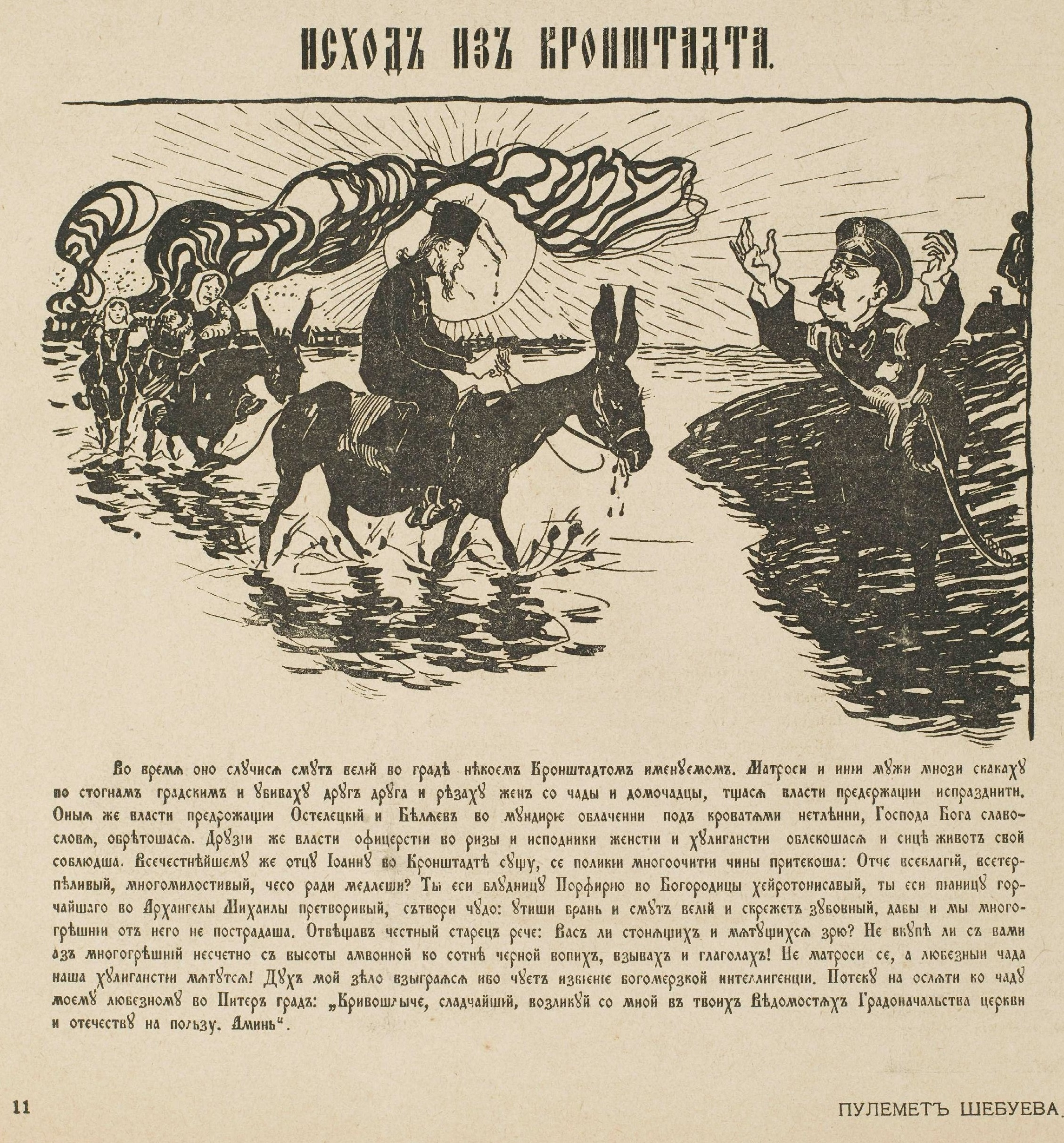
The escape of John of Kronstadt, who is met by Mikhail Krivoshlyk in St. Petersburg. Magazine «Pulemet» No. 1. (1905), caricature. New York Public Library, signature above the image:, signature under the image:

John at first condemned the participants in the Kishinev Pogrom but changed his mind. He apologized to its organisers and accused the Jews themselves of the pogroms. It is probable that John thought that the Jews had organised the events to promote the revolutionary agendas. John still condemned all acts of violence and advised to "fight in a Christian way". After the Russian Revolution of 1905, he became an ally of Russian far-right radicals, also known as the Black Hundreds, who fought against left-wing activists, liberals and Jews. He was an honorary member of the Union of the Russian People and several other right-wing organizations. He became one of the most celebrated clerics of the Russian Orthodox Church who supported the creator of the Union, Alexander Dubrovin. When Dubrovin invited the hierarchs of Moscow, St. Petersburg and Kiev as well as John to a mass meeting in November 1906, only John attended. Moreover, Metropolitan Anthonii of St. Petersburg sent Dubrovin a sharp rebuke and called his organization terrorist. John publicly consecrated the banners of the Union, thus inspiring its leaders.

John was the only priest of St. Andrew's Cathedral to flee from Kronstadt during the uprising in 1905. The rest of the priests of St. Andrew's Cathedral held a procession to the rebels and urged them to stop the uprising. The press accused John of cowardice after that act, and journals published caricatures of him.

Nikolai Leskov and Maxim Gorky were very critical of John. Gorky called him an "actor of the Imperial Churches". Leskov ridiculed John in his work Polunochniki ("Night Owls") and in a variety of letters. John was also known for his fierce attacks on Leo Tolstoy, whom he considered the devil because of his heretical innovations to the Orthodox faith. John wrote to Tolstoy, "You ought to have stone hung around your neck and be lowered with it into the depths of the sea". In 1902, a collection of such diatribes was published, and Tolstoy did not pay attention to them. In 1902, John was appointed an honorary fellow of the University of Tartu, but declined the title because Tolstoy was granted the same distinction at the same time.

His support of far-right movements and such aggressive attacks on Tolstoy led to the fact that the attitude of the "progressives" in society towards John became negative, and his figure became the personification of "Reactionary" forces.

John himself said that the enemies were slandering him. He thought they were doing so on the account of their opposition to the church as a whole. He also said that he was opposing modernism because the modernists (liberals, atheists, far-left) would transform the country into an "arena of slaughter and bloodshed". In 1907 he also prophesied the fall of the Russian Empire and the "unimaginably terrible times" coming after it.

== The Ioannites ==
Gradually, around him formed a circle of persistent admirers, who aspired to confess and to receive communion exclusively from him. Almost all were women. Some of the admirers of John formed an Ioannite sect. The head of the sect was the spiritual daughter of John, Matryona Ivanovna Kiseleva, who received in the sect the name of Porfiriia or the Theotokos. The Ioannites believed that the Christ and the saints were constantly reincarnating and that John was the incarnation of Christ, or as some believed, Prophet Elijah or God of Sabaoth. They also believed that the world as they knew it was about to end, probably after the revolution, and that they could find salvation only by going to God in the person of John. Some even stated that John was a god himself, a home for Father, Son, and Holy Spirit at the same time. The Ioannites spread stories about the miracles performed by John, sold the objects related to him and holy water, which was sanctified by John. The Ionnites even attacked John in hopes of, for example, a piece of clothing to serve as a talisman. John himself sharply condemned the actions of the sect, declaring them anathema, calling them "uneducated, mindless and crazy", and not communing them. He also went on trips to various villages on the invitation of local bishops to refute the Ioannite teachings, which he called "the doctrines of the devil".

== Death, canonization, and legacy ==
Icon of Saint John of Kronstadt. He is often depicted with a Chalice in his hands, as he advocated frequent Communion

John died in his home in Kronstadt on 2 January 1909 [O.S. 20 December 1908]. The coffin with the body was transported through St. Petersburg with reverent ceremonies and buried in the Ioannovsky Convent. According to his last will, all his possessions were bequeathed to the convent, which brought great benefits to it and aroused suspicions of forgery.

In 1909, Tsar Nicholas II wrote an order to establish the commemoration of St. John in the Church. Subsequently, the Most Holy Synod issued an edict to commemorate him annually on the day of his death.

His grave became a place of pilgrimage. After the October Revolution, the Soviet authorities decided to eliminate it. In 1923 to 1926, when the Ioannovsky Convent began to be closed, the option of reburial in one of the cemeteries was discussed, but the idea met resistance from Soviet authorities, who feared that the new grave would become another place of veneration. Also discussed was the option of bricking up the crypt and later burying the remains more deeply, along with concreting the floor of the crypt. It is known that the crypt was indeed bricked up, but there is no information on reburial. The book of the Soviet historian of religion Nikolai Yudin claimed that a coffin with the bones of John was taken far out of city and burned. After 1990, the Church-necropolis (Russian: Церковь-усыпальница) of John was consecrated in the crypt of the Cathedral of the Twelve Apostles of the Ioannovsky Convent; inside the Church necropolis, where the coffin of John used to be, a new empty coffin on the floor (sarcophagus) was built. The official website of the John Convent claims that the relics continue to be in the crypt, but there have been no excavations that could prove it. The Orthodox Encyclopedia: states that the tombstone (sarcophagus) is located above John's relics.

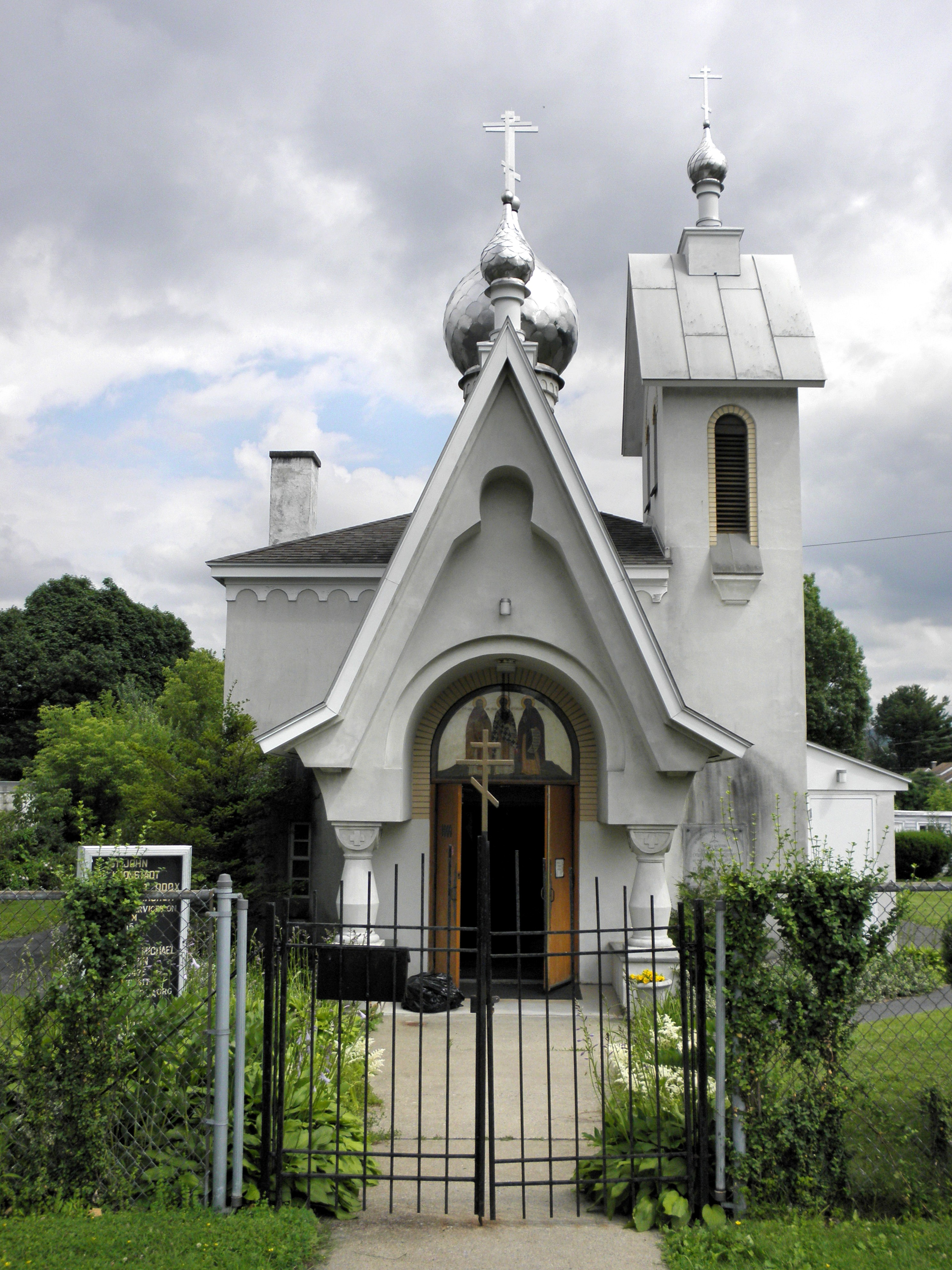
St. John of Kronstadt Memorial Church, in Utica, NY. Dedicated in 1964 as the first church in the world to St. John of Kronstadt.

On November 1, 1964, he was canonized by the Russian Orthodox Church Outside Russia (ROCOR), and this was the church's first such canonization independent from Moscow Patriarchate. St. John Maximovitch of San Francisco played an active role in preparing his canonization. A well-known conservative ideologist of the ROCOR, Archimandrite Constantine (Zaitsev) believed that the most powerful heavenly patrons of Russia were John and Nicholas II with his family.

In 1990, after the beginning of perestroika and the liberalization of church life in the Soviet Union, John was canonized by the Moscow Patriarchate. Also, after 1990, the rehabilitation of the sectarian Ioannites started, and even the Ioannite leaders who had been condemned by the Synod were incorporated into the mainstream Orthodoxy in Russia.

From 1990 to 2016, more than 60 new churches or altars in Russia alone were dedicated to him. There is also a church named after him in Hamburg, Germany. His flat in Kronstadt was partly restored and officially registered as a memorial museum. His biography was published in the most respected Russian series of biographical books, Lives of Remarkable People. The John Apartment Museum is located in Kronstadt, at 21 Posadskaya Street. Monuments to John have been placed in Kronstadt, Irkutsk and Moscow.

Ioannovsky Convent, the second-largest monastic community in Saint Petersburg, is closely connected with his name. It was established by John, and during his life, he spiritually nourished the convent.

In 2014, Vitaly Milonov proposed to establish 14 June as a memorial day for John in Saint Petersburg but the Federation of Jewish Communities of the CIS was absolutely opposed and made an official statement: "John of Kronstadt was a member of the odious Black-Hundred organization Union of the Russian People, known for its terrible anti-Semitism and moral support for Jewish pogroms in pre-revolutionary Russia"

== Iconography and commemoration ==
Icons of John most commonly portray him holding a Communion chalice because he reawakened the Russian Orthodox Church to the apostolic tradition of receiving Holy Communion every Divine Liturgy.

His life and work are commemorated on the feast days of 20 December Old Style (2 January New Style) and 19 October Old Style (1 November New Style).

== Works in translation ==
- Predigt am Tage der Einführung der Allgepriesenen Jungfrau Maria in den Tempel translated by Karl Christian Felmy (in German)
- Predigt über die Kommunion der heiligen Geheimnisse translated by Karl Christian Felmy (in German)
- Mein Leben in Christo. Aus dem Tagebuch, Übers. v. S. H. Kurio, München 2008, ISBN 978-3-935217-33-0.
- Blessed Father John of Kronstadt on Prayer (1966 Jordanville)
- Counsels on the Christian Priesthood, tr. W. J. Grisbrooke (1994 Crestwood)
- Spiritual Counsels of Father John of Kronstadt, tr. E. E. Goulaev (1967 London)
- My Life In Christ Or Moments of Spiritual Serenity ... Extracts From The Diary Of ... John Ilyich Sergieff ... Cronstadt ... Translated ... By E. E. Goulaeff (1897)
- My Life in Christ at archive.org
- Sorrow and Joy: A Homily on the Day of the Nativity of the Most Holy Mother of God at pravoslavie.ru
- My Life in Christ: The Spiritual Journals of St John of Kronstadt. translated by E.E. Goulaev, revised by Nicholas Kotar. Holy Trinity Publications, 2018. ISBN 9780884654650
- Season of Repentance: Lenten Homilies of St John of Kronstadt. translated by Sergio Tancredo Sette Camara E Silva. Holy Trinity Publications, 2015. ISBN 9780884653844

== Notes ==
1. His date of birth using Old Style dates is 19 October 1829.
2. His date of death using Old Style dates is 20 December 1908.
