= Leontiy Miropolskiy =

Russian painter

- Леонтий Семёнович Миропольский
- Born: 1759
- Died: August 15, 1819 (aged 59–60); Saint Petersburg, Russian Empire
- Education: Member Academy of Arts (1794)
- Alma mater: Imperial Academy of Arts
- Known for: Painting

Leontiy Semenovich Mitropolsky or Miropol'skii (Russian: Леонтий Семёнович Миропольский; 1759—1819) was a Russian painter, portraitist, copyist and an icon painter. He is an academician of the Imperial Academy of Arts.

== Biography ==
He studied at the Imperial Academy of Arts in St. Petersburg with Dmitry Levitsky. He received the title of "candidate for academicians" (1779). He received the title of academician (1794) for a portrait of the adjunct professor Gabriel Ignatievich Kozlov, an associate professor at the Academy of Arts.

== Work ==
He received numerous orders from the Imperial Academy of Fine Arts to paint different artistic works. He is famous for his painted portraits of children. In 1794, he received the title of academician for a portrait of the adjunct professor Gabriel Ignatievich Kozlov (currently in the museum of the Imperial Academy of Fine Arts). The portraits completed by him are distinguished by strict individualization of the image and are close to the works of his teacher Dmitry Levitzky (portraits of Pyotr Vyazemsky, Countess Komarovskaya, E. A. Melgunova and D. F. Astafieva).

He was also an excellent copyist and icon painter. He painted icons for St. Andrew's Cathedral in Kronstadt which is now destroyed.

In State Russian Museum his portrait of the Grand Duke Konstantin Pavlovich Konstantin painted in his childhood is kept.

His works are now in the State Tretyakov Gallery, State Russian Museum, National Gallery of the Republic of Komi.

Leontiy Miropolskiy's works

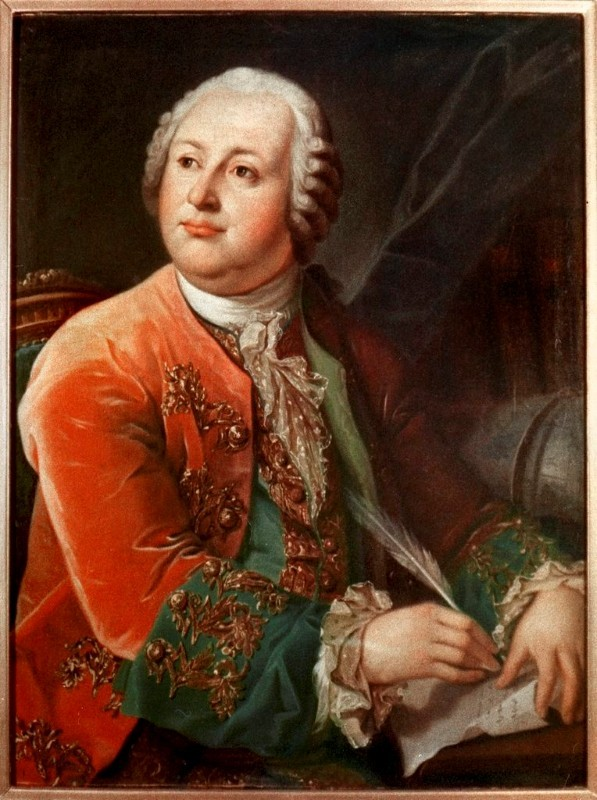
Portrait of Mikhail Lomonosov (1787)

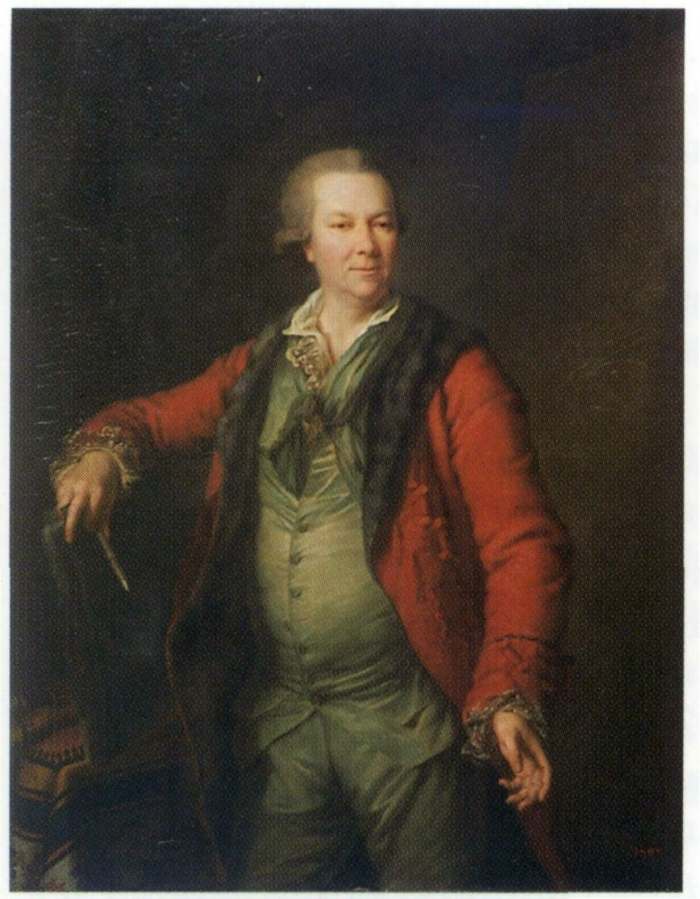
Portrait of Professor Gabriel Kozlov (1780s)

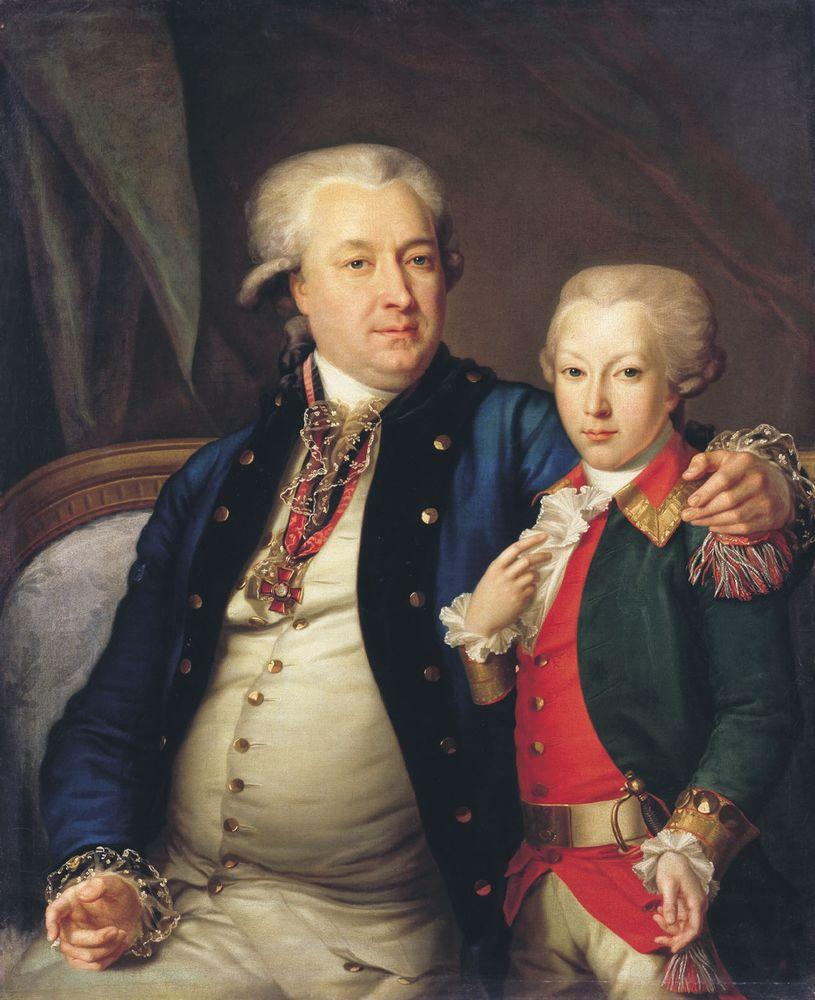
Portrait of an unknown with his son (1780s)

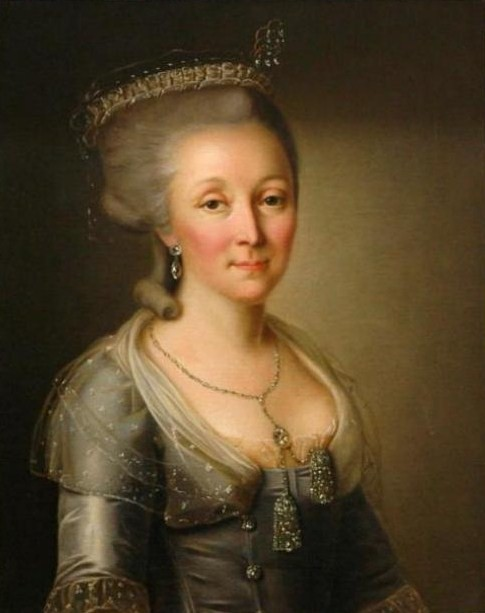
Portrait of Princess Elena Vyazemskaya

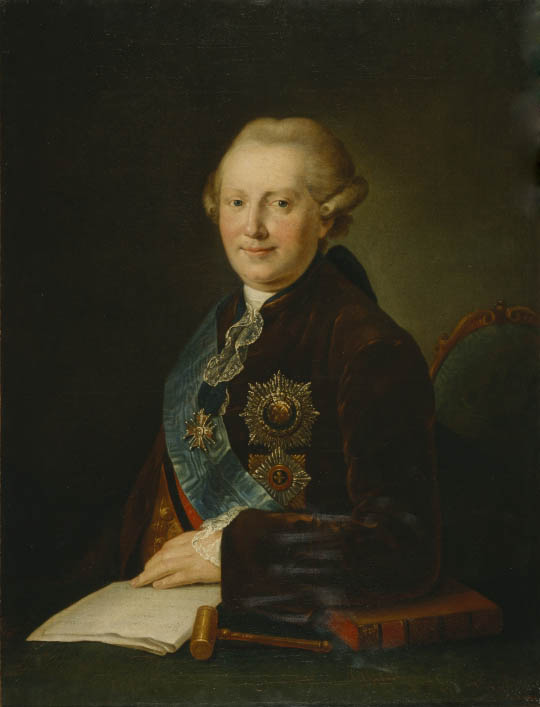
Portrait of Prince AA Vyazemsky

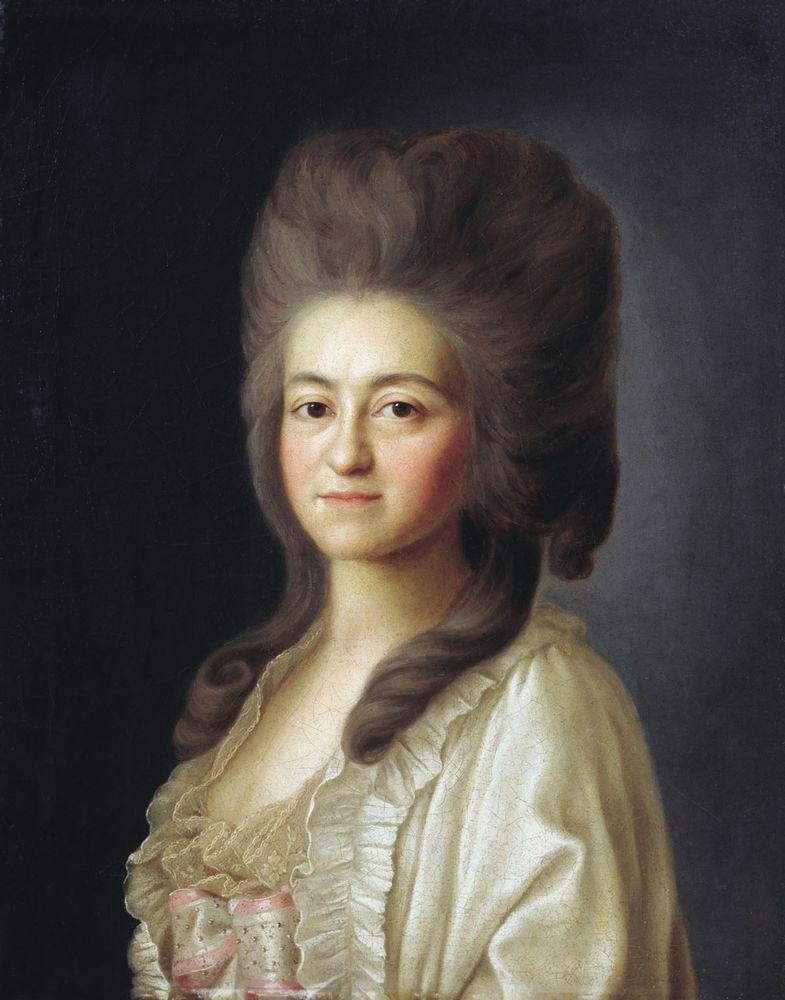
Portrait of Ye.A. Melgunovoy
