= Ioannovsky Convent =

Monastery in Saint Petersburg, Russia

Coordinates: 59°58′14″N 30°18′1″E

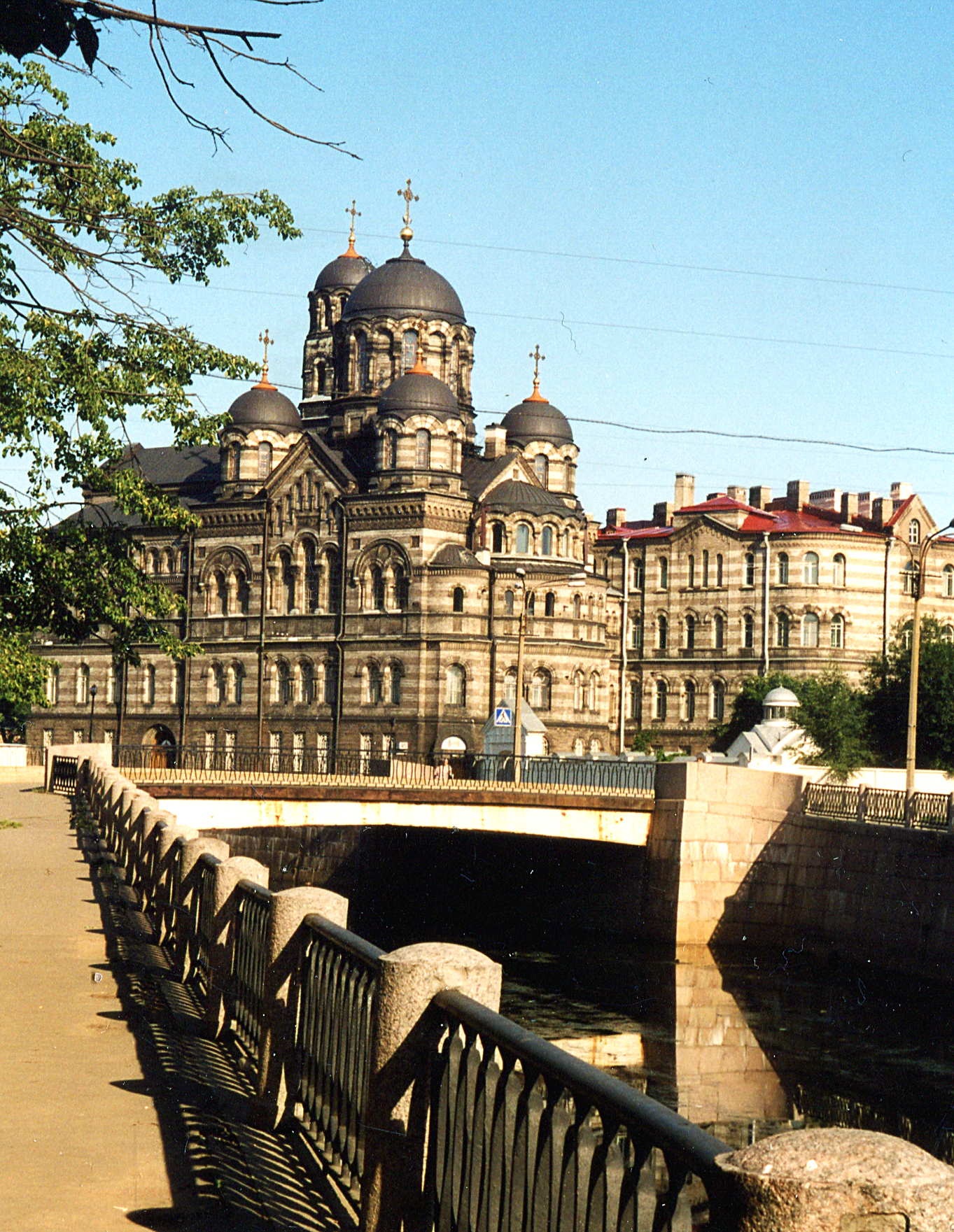
The Convent of St. John of Rila

The Convent of St. John of Rila (Иоанновский монастырь) is the largest convent in St. Petersburg, Russia and the only stauropegic nunnery in that city.

John of Kronstadt (later Saint John of Kronstadt) established the monastery on the bank of the Karpovka River in 1900 as a branch of the Sura Monastery of St. John the Theologian. The main pentacupolar church of the Twelve Apostles (1902) was built to a Neo-Byzantine design by Nikolay Nikonov. The ground floor contains the marble tomb of Saint John of Kronstadt.

The Soviets disbanded the convent in 1923. It re-opened as a branch of Pühtitsa Convent in 1991.
