= Mikhail Krivoshlyk =

Russian journalist, writer, and politician

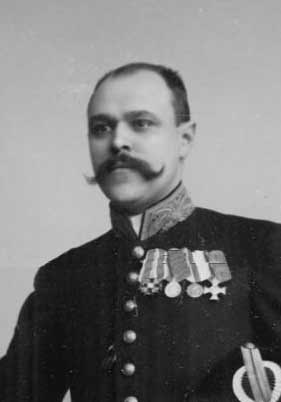
Mikhail Hryhorovych Krivoshlyk

Mikhail Hryhorovych Krivoshlyk (Russian: Михаил Григорьевич Кривошлык; 1864 — after 1918), was a Russian Journalist, Writer, editor-publisher and State Councillor.

Mikhail Hryhorovych Krivoshlyk graduated from the Lubny Men's Gymnasium. He graduated from the Faculty of Law at Saint Petersburg State University. Krivoshlyk associate editor of the newspaper «Vedomosti of the St. Petersburg City Government and the Metropolitan Police» in 1892 — 1898. He editor of the newspaper «Vedomosti of the St. Petersburg City Government and the Metropolitan Police» in 1898 — 1914. Krivoshlyk was dismissed from his post, on him, as well as on his patron, mayor D.V. Drachevsky, started a business for abuse of service.

Krivoshlyk had awards: the Order of St. Anne and St. Stanislav III degree, medal from the French president, silver cross of the Order of St. Alexander from the Bulgarian prince, star from the emir of Bukhara, order of the officer's cross Italian Crown.

In 1896 he wrote the book «Historical anecdotes from the life of Russian remarkable people» (Russian: «Исторические анекдоты из жизни русских замечательных людей»), during his lifetime it was published eight times. Mikhail Hryhorovych Krivoshlyk was the spiritual son of John of Kronstadt. He published a book of John of Kronstadt «Мысли протоиерея Иоанна Ильича Сергиева, настоятеля Кронштадтского Андреевского собора О различных предметах христианской веры и нравственности : С портр. и краткой биогр. пастыря».

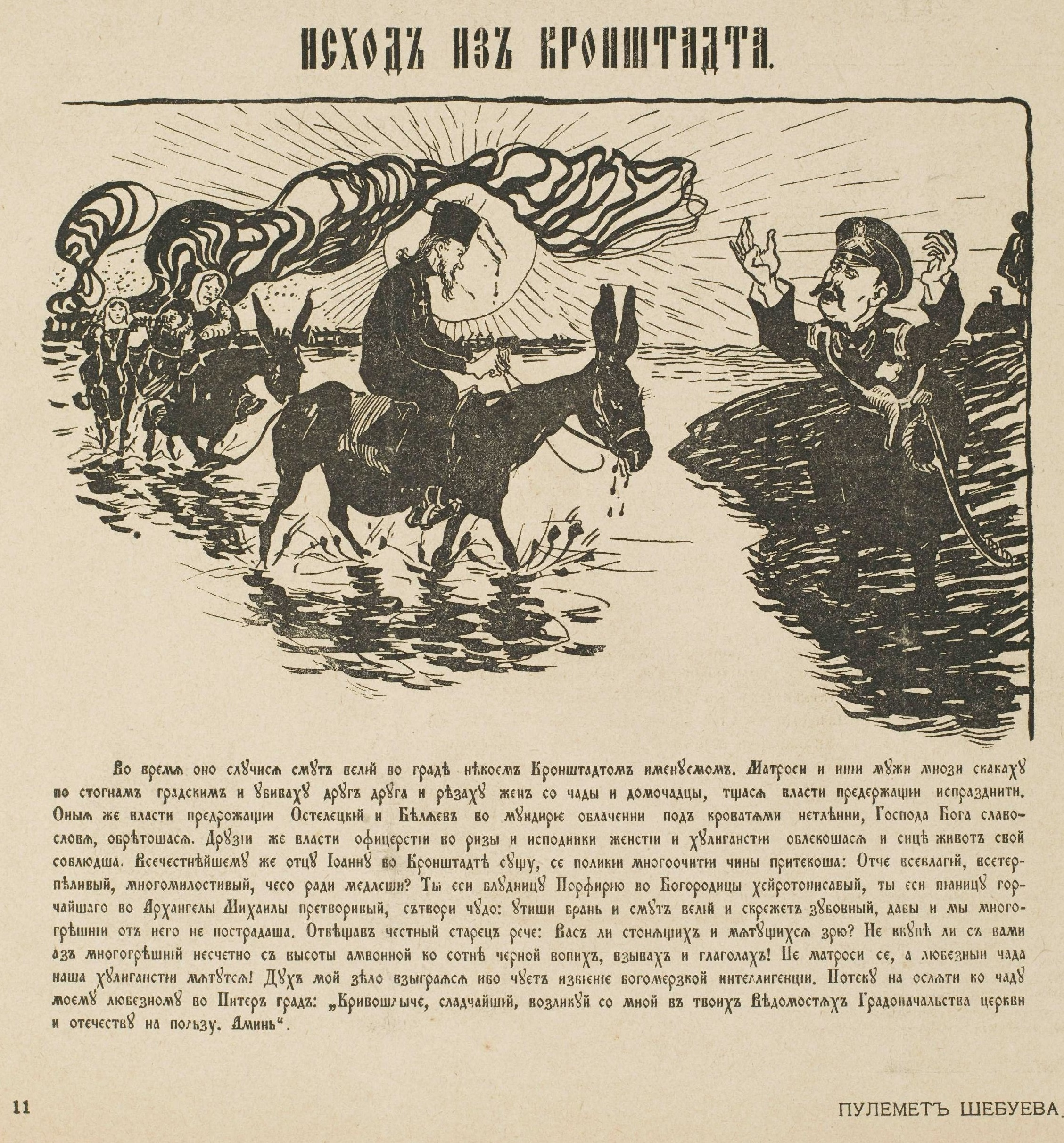
The escape of John of Kronstadt and he is met by Mikhail Krivoshlyk in St. Petersburg. Magazine «Pulemet» № 1. (1905), caricature. New York Public Library, signature under the image: Во время оно случися смутъ велiй во граде некоемъ Кронштадтомъ именуемомъ. Матроси и иніи мужи мнози скокаху по стогнамъ градскимъ и убиваху другъ друга и резаху женъ со чады и домочадцы, тщася власти придержащiи испразднити. Оныя же власти предрожащiи Остелецкiй и Беляевъ во мундирiе облачении подъ кроватями нетленни, Господа Бога славословя, обретошася. Друзiи же власти офицерстiи во ризы и исподники женстiи и хулиганстiи облекошася, и сице животъ свой соблюдоша. Всечестнейшему же отцу Iоанну во Кронштедте сущу, се поликіи многочитіи чины притекоша: Отче всеблагіи, всетерпеливый, многомилостивый, чесо ради медлиши? Ты еси блудницу Порфирію во Богородицу хейротанисавый, ты еси піяницу горчайшего во Архангела Михаила претворивый, сътвори чудо: утиши брань и смутъ велій и скрежетъ зубовный, да бы и мы многогрешніи от него не пострадавша. Отвещав честный старецъ рече: Вас ли стонящихъ и мятущихся зрю? Не вкупе ли с вами азъ многогрешніи неисчестно с высоты амвонной ко сотне черной вопихъ, взывахъ и глаголахъ! Не матроси се, а любезные чада наша хулиганстіи мятутся! Духъ мой зело взыграяся ибо чуетъ избиеніе богомерзской интелдигенціи. Потеку на осляти ко чаду моему любезному во Питеръ градъ; "Кривошлыче, сладчайшій, возликуй со мной въ твоихъ Ведомостяхъ Градоначальства церкви и отечеству на пользу. Аминь"

== Literary works ==
- Исторические анекдоты из жизни русских замечательных людей : (С крат. биогр. их) / М.Г. Кривошлык. - Санкт-Петербург : тип. В.М. Курочкина, 1896. - 4, 156 с.
  - То же. - 2-е изд., доп. - Спб.: К. Геруц, 1897. - [6], 192 с.: портр., 1 л. портр.
  - То же. - 3-е изд. - 1898.
  - То же. - 4-е изд. - 1898.
  - То же. - 5-е изд. - 1898.
  - То же. - 6-е изд. - 1898.
  - То же. - 7-е изд., (доп.). - Спб.: М. Г. Кривошлык, 1903. - [8], 233 с.: портр. -
  - То же. - 8-е изд., доп. - 1909
  - То же. - [Репринт. изд.]. (Вых. дан. ориг.: СПб: Изд. К. Герунца, 1898) - М. : Совмест. сов.-австр. предприятие "Х. Г. С.", 1990]
  - То же. - [Репринт. изд.]. - М. : Изд.-полигр. фирма "АНС-Принт", 1991]
- Великие полководцы мира: в биографиях и анекдотах с портретами / М. Г. Кривошлык. - Спб.: Б. и., 1898.
  - То же. - 2-е изд., доп. - 1899. - [8], 143 с.: портр.
  - То же. - 3-е изд., доп. - 1904. - [8], 163 с.: портр.
  - То же. - 4-е изд., доп. - 1904. - [8], 163 с.: ил.;
  - То же. - 4-е изд., - Москва : ЛЕНАНД, 2015.
- Мир вам! : (братский листок) / ред.-изд. М. Г. Кривошлык. - Петроград, 1918.
