= Alexander Nevsky Cathedral, Izhevsk =

Church in Izhevsk Udmurtia, Russia

Coordinates: 56°50′38.65″N 53°12′4.49″E

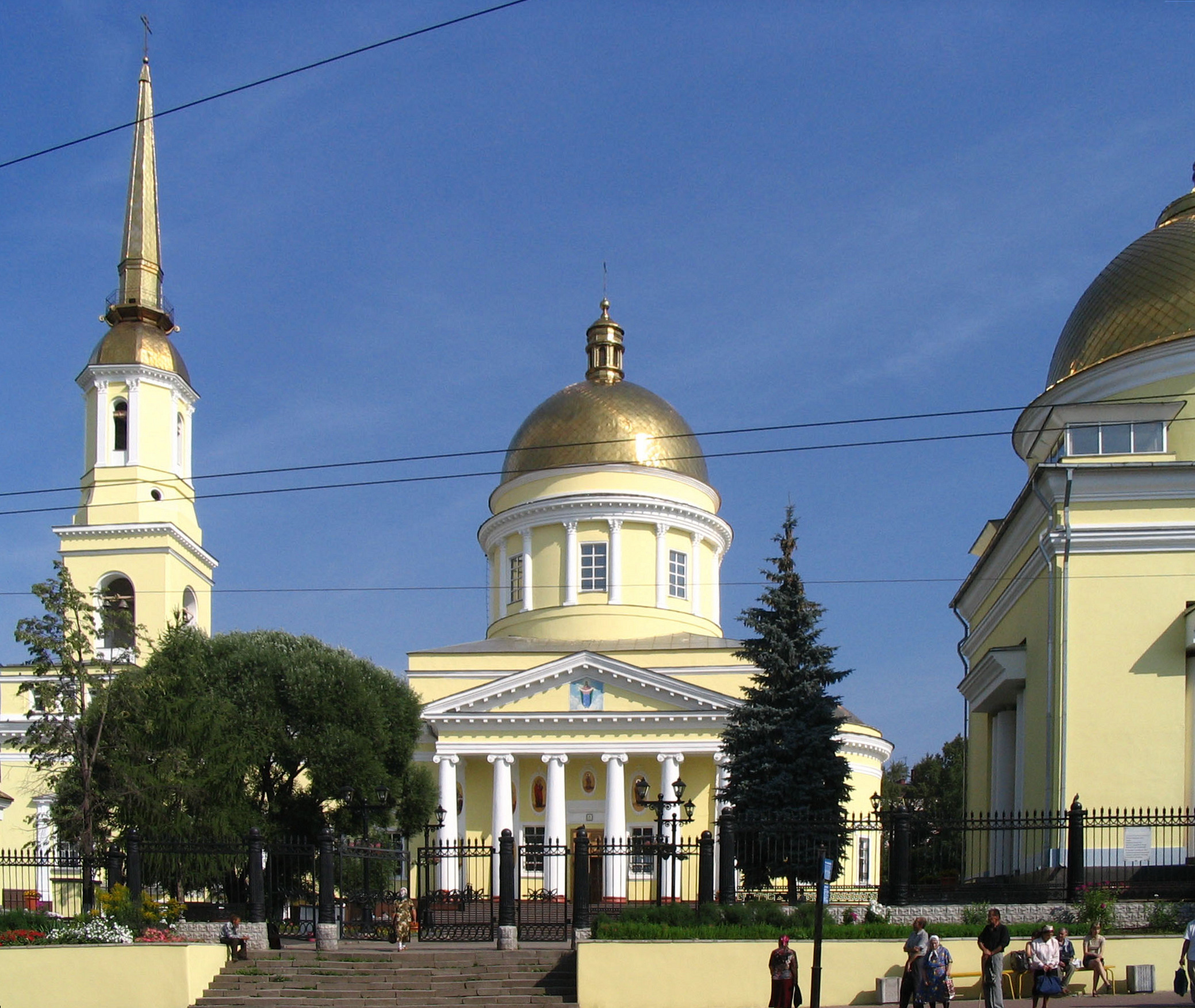
The cathedral in 2007

The Alexander Nevsky Cathedral (Russian: Алекса́ндро-Не́вский собо́р) is a Russian Orthodox cathedral, located in Izhevsk, Udmurtia, Russia.

The cathedral is dedicated to St. Alexander Nevsky. The Neoclassical building has a round golden cupola, an Ionic portico and a steepled bell tower rising above it.

Like the Dnipropetrovsk Cathedral in Ukraine, the building was modeled on St. Andrew's Cathedral in Kronstadt (whose architect was Andreyan Zakharov). It was erected between 1818 and 1823 and was visited by Alexander I of Russia within several months after its completion. (Alexander Nevsky was the emperor's patron saint). In the Soviet years the building stood domeless and was used as a cinema.

== See also ==
- St. Michael's Cathedral (Izhevsk)
