= Church of Saint John of Kronstadt (Hamburg) =

Russian Orthodox church in Hamburg

- Kirche des heiligen Johannes von Kronstadt
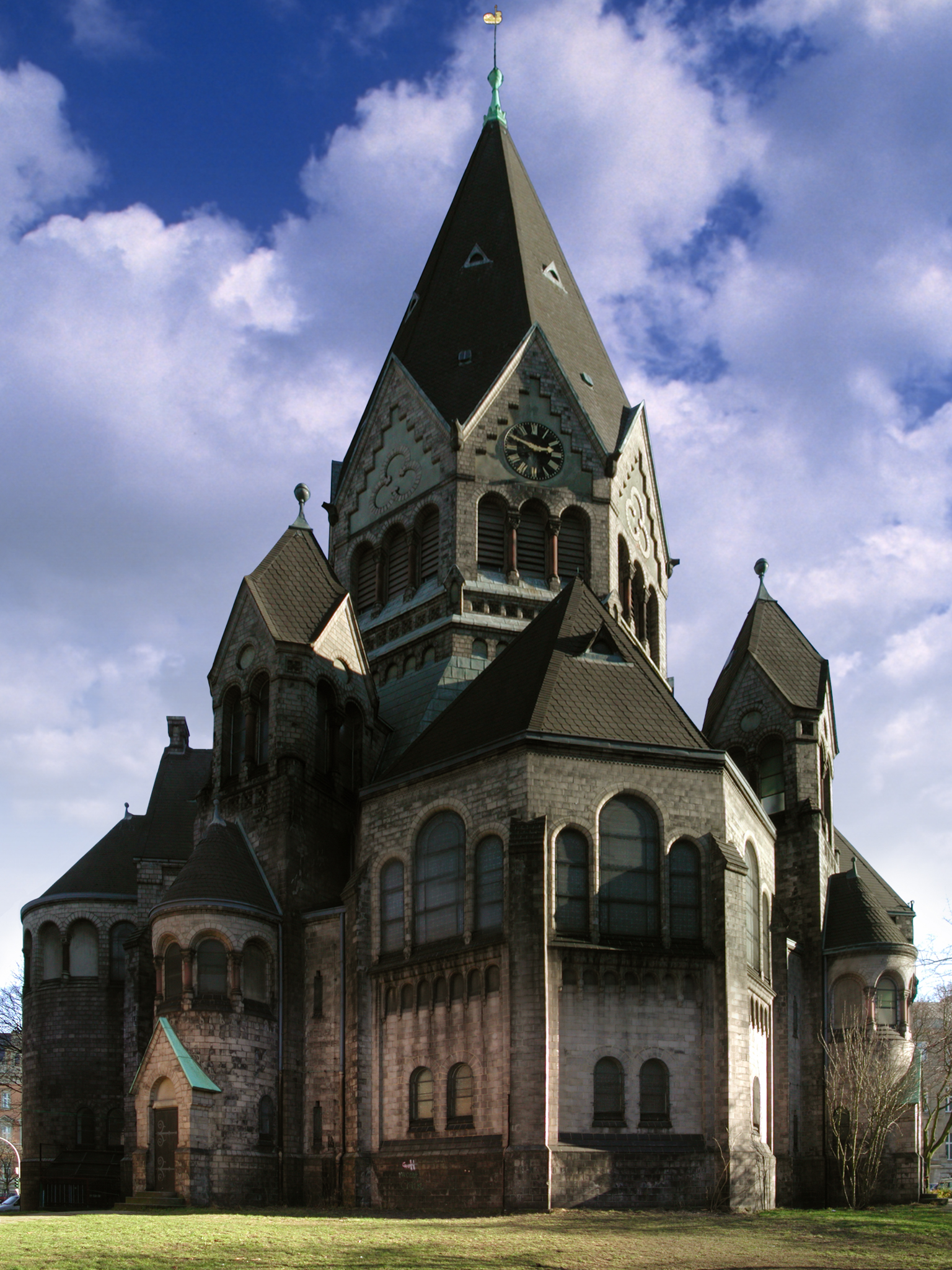
- The Church of Grace in 2004, when it was renamed after Saint John of Kronstadt

Religion
- Affiliation: Russian Orthodox
- Year consecrated: 1907

Location
- Location: St. Pauli, Hamburg, Germany
- Interactive map of Church of Saint John of Kronstadt
- Coordinates: 53°33′27″N 9°58′34″E

Architecture
- Architect: Fernando Lorenzen
- Style: Neo-Romanesque

Website
- hamburg-orthodox.de

The Church of St. John of Kronstadt (German: Kirche des heiligen Johannes von Kronstadt) is a Russian Orthodox church located in the city of Hamburg, Germany. Within Hamburg, the church is located in the St. Pauli quarter. The church provides a place of worship for many Russian Orthodox believers, largely of Russian, Ukrainian, or Georgian heritage. The congregation has also made an effort to act as a Russian cultural hub, opening a community center next door that is partially dedicated to showcasing Russian art and music.

The church had previously been called the Church of Grace (Gnadenkirche). It was part of the Evangelical Lutheran church and was originally built as a branch church of St. Pauli's Church. Because of declining numbers of people in their congregation, the congregation of the Church of Grace merged with the congregation of the Evangelical Lutheran Congregation of St. Pauli South in 2002. However, the associated costs made it untenable to keep this church building. Even though very little money changed hands, it still made financial sense for the combined congregation to give the building up, and with the Russian Orthodox Church as the new owners, it remained a Christian church.

== Church of Grace ==
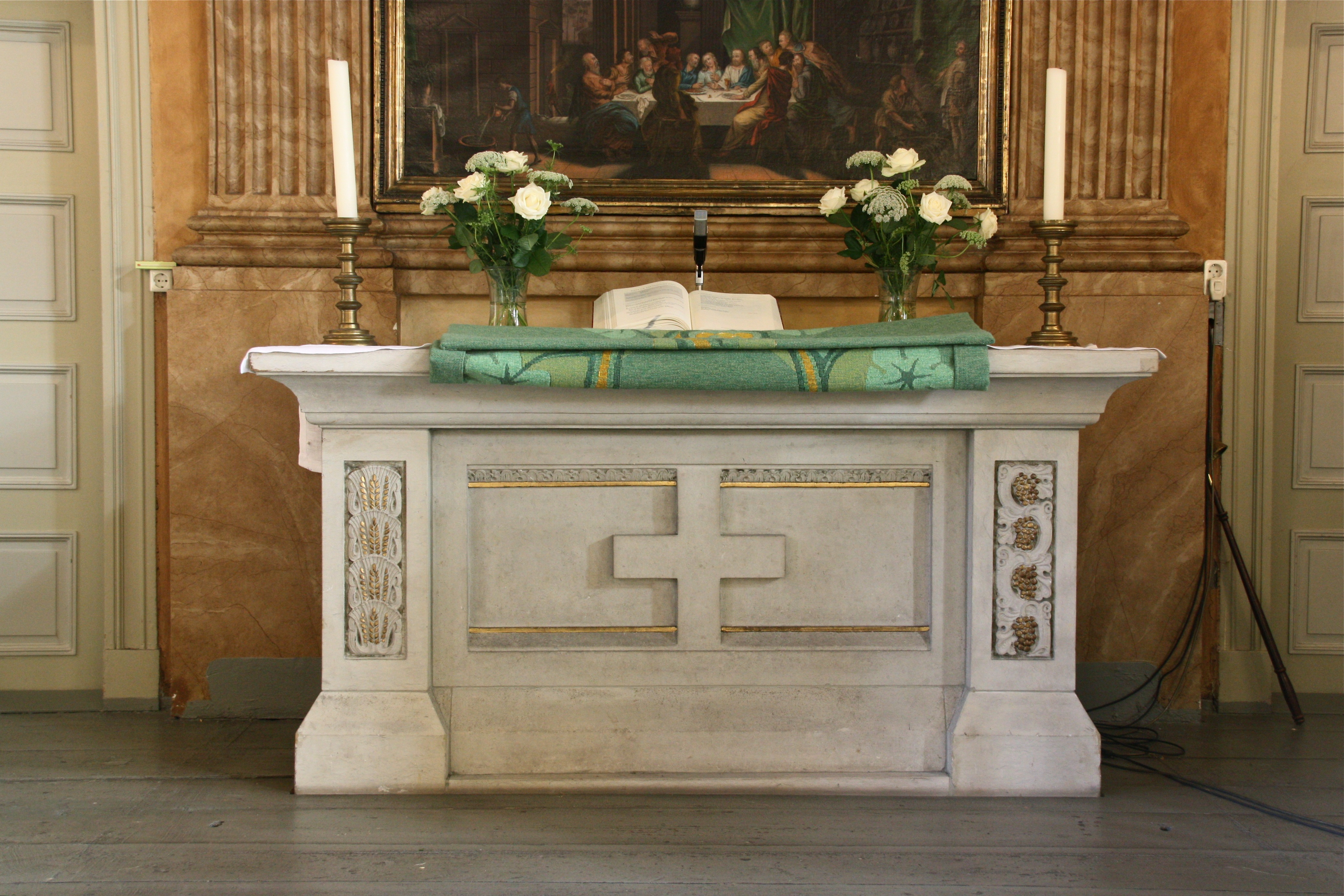
Church of Grace's old altar, shown in St. Pauli's Church

The Church of Grace was built by the congregation of St. Pauli's Church to serve the northern portion of the St. Pauli's district. Fernando Lorenzen (1859–1917) designed the Church of Grace that was completed in 1907 on Karolinenstrasse. By this time, Lorenzen was already the architect of several churches, including the Kreuzkirche in Hamburg-Ottensen. The Church of Grace was built in the Neo-Romanesque style. Lorenzen drew inspiration from Eastern European church architecture, especially that of Georgia. The floor plan is in the shape of a Greek cross (a cross with four equal branches). The name of the church was an intentional reference to the grace of God, owing to the location of the church between a prison and a courthouse.

The building was rebuilt in 1947 after its destruction in World War II. At this time, the St. Pauli congregation was using the church. In this capacity, the building was part of the North Elbian Evangelical Lutheran Church organization. However, the church was still in long-standing need of renovation. Church attendance was declining beginning in the 1960s. This was largely due to the demographic changes in the vicinity of the church.

The church could not be financially supported, although there was an attempt to turn the building into an "art church" as part of the "art and church" program. This did not make the church financially viable, nor did the merger of the congregation with the Evangelical Lutheran Congregation of St. Pauli South. Therefore, the building was sold for a nominal price of one euro to the Russian Orthodox Church in 2004. On the other hand, the church did have to buy the land on which the church was built from the city of Hamburg.

== Acquiring the church ==
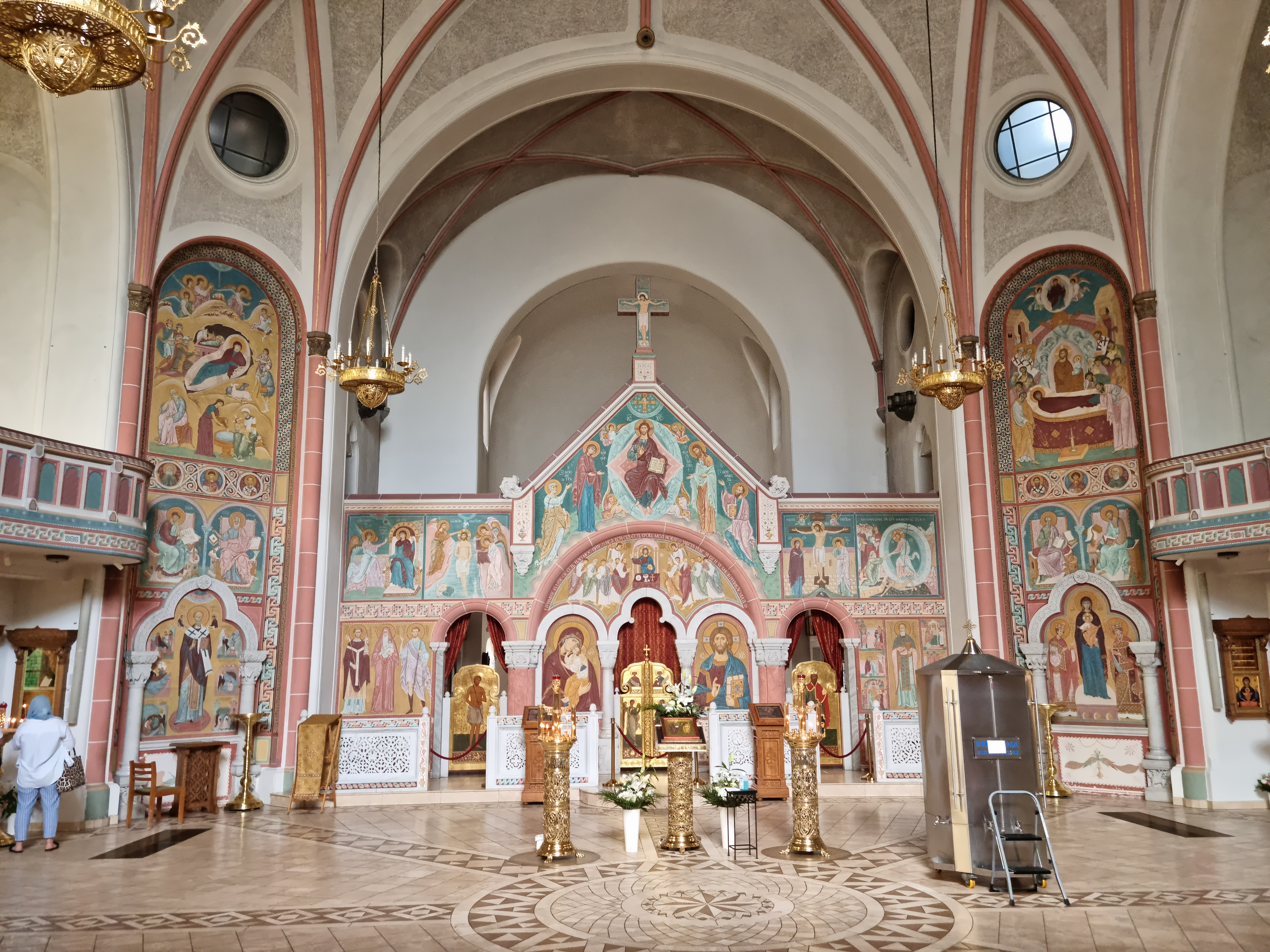
Interior, including iconostasis

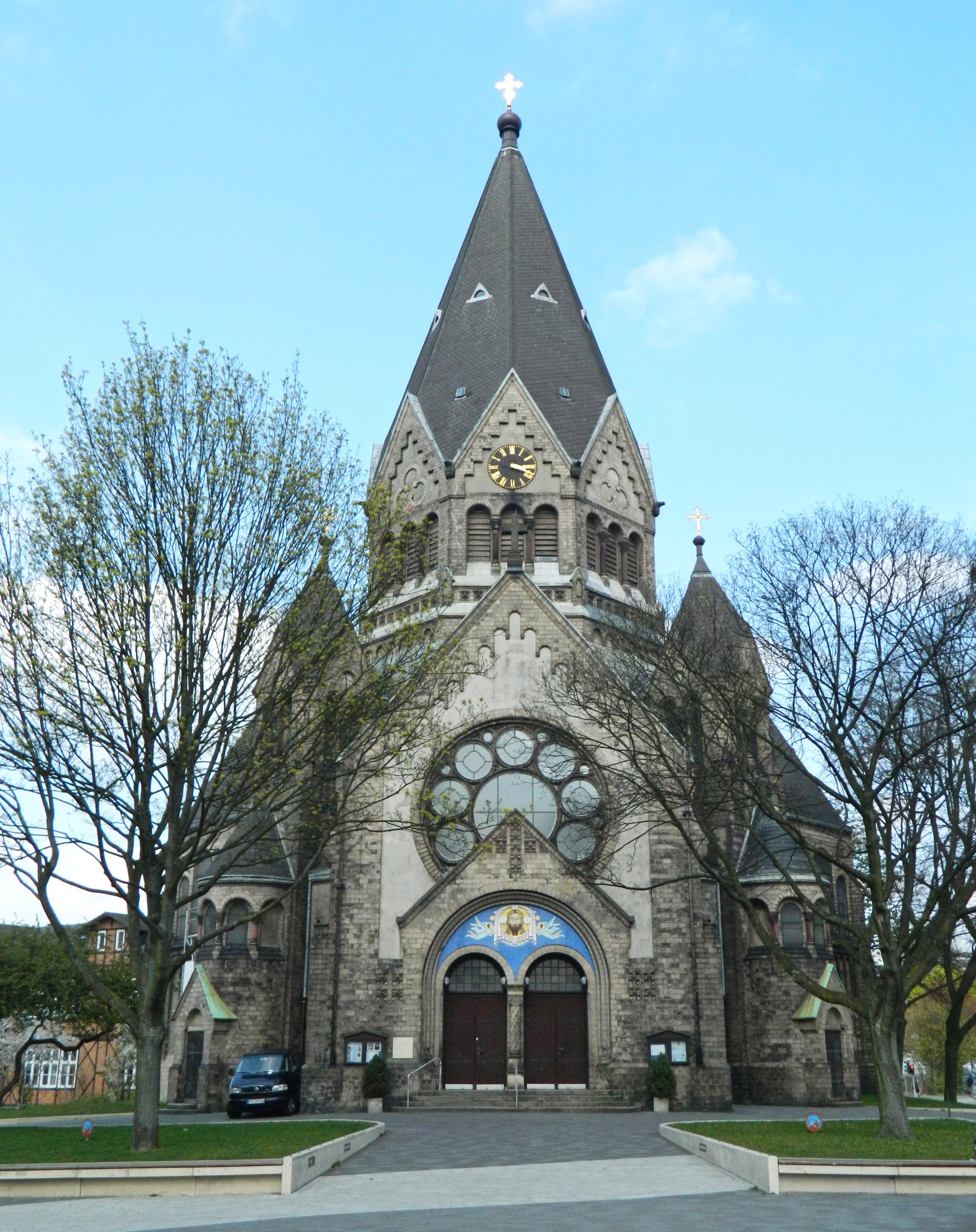
Alternate exterior view

The church was given to the congregation of St. John of Kronstadt in part so that it would remain in use as a church. However, the building needed to be modified to make it suitable for a Russian Orthodox congregation. The sandstone altar was moved to St. Pauli Church. It was not until 2007 that the church was fully renovated in the Russian Orthodox style and in that year, the Lutherans and the Russian Orthodox congregation celebrated the hundredth anniversary of the building together. In the same year Hamburg celebrated the fiftieth anniversary of its city-partnership with St. Petersburg.

The church has an iconostasis, a feature of Eastern Orthodox churches that stands before the sanctuary. It was made by some of the best icon-painters in Moscow. A preexisting wall in the church was used for this purpose, but it first needed to be prepared for painting through reintroducing plaster in some areas and removing paint from plaster in others. Because of the church's new ties to Russia, these renovation efforts needed to be supervised by a conservator of monuments from St. Petersburg, who participated in video-conferences at certain junctures. Among other saints, it includes three Germans who were canonized by the Russian Orthodox Church. The paintings were made with pastel pinks, oranges and greens as well as shining gold and other colors. The fresco painting techniques that the icon-painters used to convert the previously existing wall into an iconostasis make this work unique in Europe.

Among the changes on the outside of the church are five little onion-domes on top of the church's spires. On top of each of these is a small shining Greek cross. Because of its rounded architecture and its Gothic and Romanesque features, it was already somewhat similar to the Byzantine Eastern church style. The updates to the building have made the differences from an Eastern Orthodox church even less noticeable.

== Modern use ==
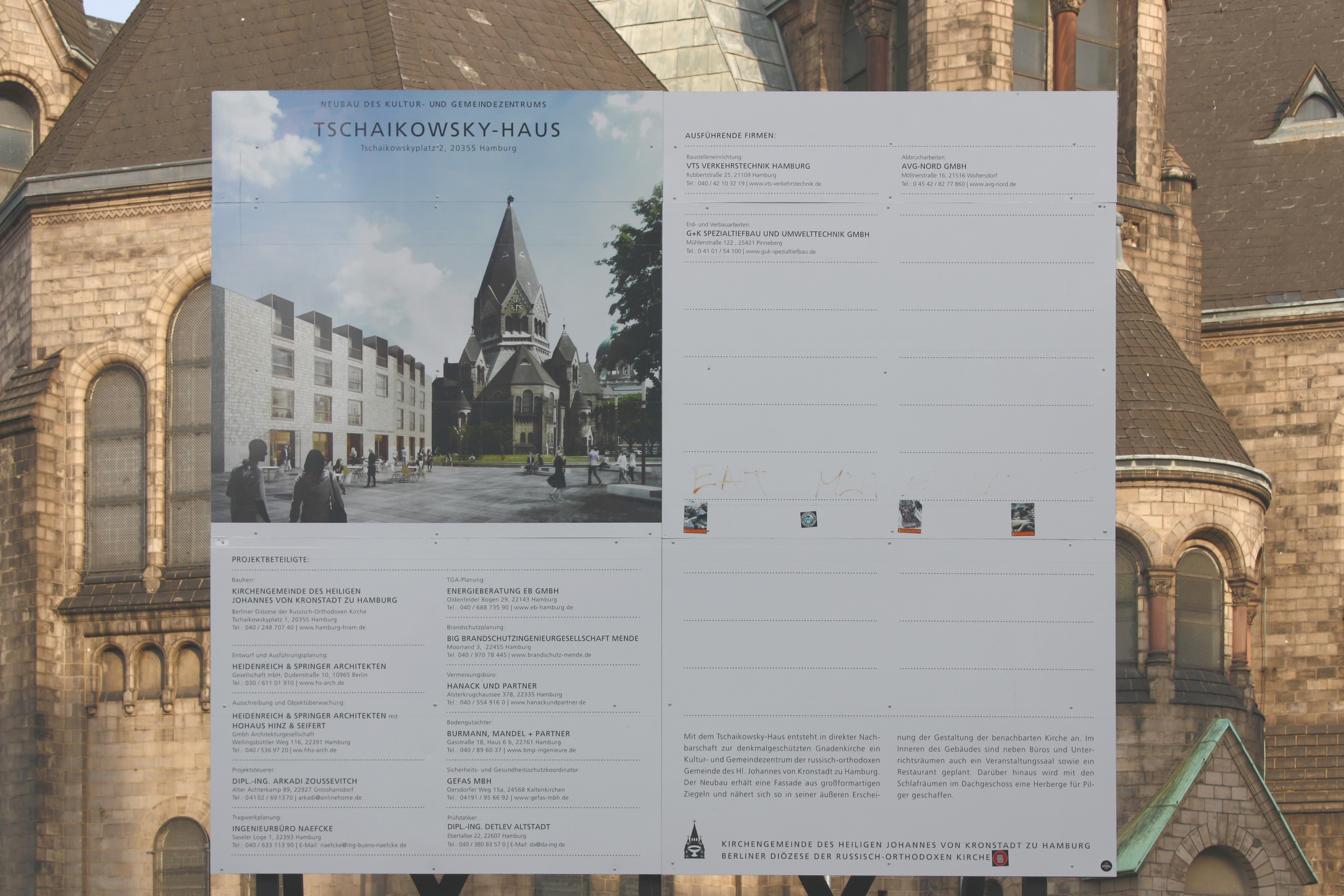
Construction board for Tschaikowkskyhaus against backdrop of church

There are about 2,000 members of the congregation, many of whom come from Russia, Ukraine or Georgia. In 2022, there were about 37,000 people with a Russian background and about 35,000 with a Ukrainian background. In 2005, some estimated the number of Russian-speaking non-Germans living in Hamburg and the surrounding region as high as 200,000. Many of these people identify with Eastern Christianity and are spiritually cared for by several parishes of the Russian Orthodox Church in Hamburg and the surrounding area, such as the Church of St. Procopius of Ustyug in Hamburg, Church of St. Cyril and Methodius in Hamburg, Ukrainian Parish of the Protection of the Holy Virgin in Hamburg, Russian Orthodox Parish in Lüneburg as well as communities of other Orthodox churches located in Hamburg such as Serbian Orthodox Church, Bulgarian Orthodox Church, Romanian Orthodox Church and others. Russians and other Eastern Europeans from around the Hamburg area may visit the church for a sense of community and a place to speak in their native language, even beyond a place to worship.

The languages of worship are Church Slavonic and Russian, with parts of some services in German. The church's community center, built next door and called the Tschaikovsky House (German:Tschaikowskyhaus), was opened in 2014. It includes furnished attic rooms where pilgrims and believers can give a donation to spend the night. The building includes a concert hall, Tschaikovsky Hall (German: Tschaikovskysaal, and while it has a wider cultural mission, two of its primary focuses are Russian culture and cross-cultural collaboration between Germany and Russia. The community house also includes, among other things, a restaurant, an art school, a theater school and a Sunday school for children.

The square where the church is located, as well as part of the nearby street, were renamed Tschaikovsky Square (Tschaikowskyplatz) in 2011 after the famous Russian composer responsible for Swan Lake, The Nutcracker and the 1812 Overture. He also visited Hamburg six times between 1861 and 1893.

== St. John of Kronstadt ==
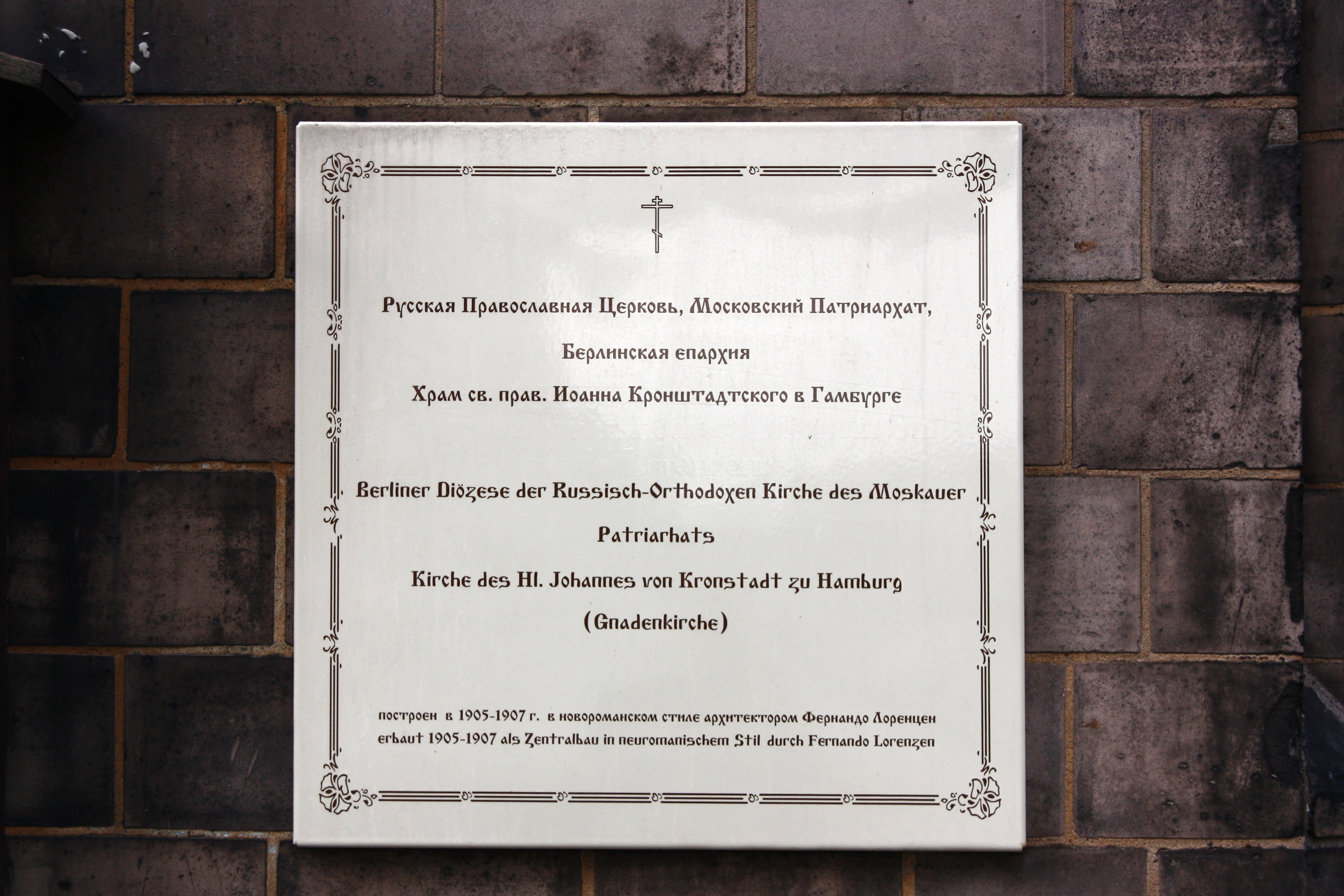
Bilingual sign in German and Russian showing church's name and sectarian allegiance

John was ordained in 1856 and was unusually devoted to helping the poor. He worked with the destitute in Kronstadt, which was where many of the poorest people from St. Petersburg were sent to keep the city looking clean. Aside from the material good that he offered many of the needy who he met, he was also widely believed to have the power to perform miracles. In the 1860s, he also wrote against the unequal distribution of wealth in Russia, describing the rich as vultures.

However, the assassination of Alexander II in 1881 caused John to disassociate himself from anti-czarists and swing to the political right. He soon declared in sermons that God supported Russian autocracy, and a number of right wing groups claimed him as an honorary member. His beliefs reflected those of the members of the lower class who felt threatened by change.

In response to the Kishinev Pogrom, John and a bishop signed a letter condemning the attacks made by Christians who killed 49 Jewish people and raped many Jewish women. The anti-Jewish mob would claim that it was reacting to rumors of ritualistic murder carried out by Jewish members of the community. John would later change his tune and claim that the Jewish population of the town had provoked the attacks. At least one source suggests that his thought process was that the attacks were provoked intentionally for political gain.
