= Porfiriia Kiselyova =

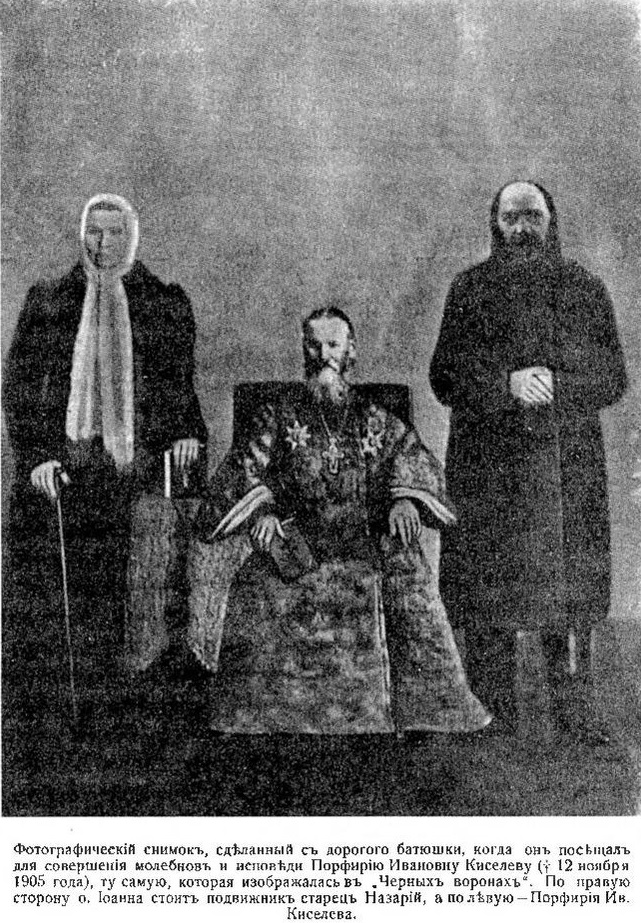
John of Kronstadt with the leaders of the Ioannites sect, to the right of the archpriest - Matryona Ivanovna Kiseleva (Porfiriia), to the left - Nazarii Dmitriev (starets Nazarii); photo Porfiriia confessed to John

Matryona Ivanovna Kiseleva (Russian: Матрёна Ивановна Киселёва; 1855 — 25 November [O.S. 12 November] 1905) was a spiritual leader of the Ioannite sect of Russian Orthodox Church.

== Life ==
In her youth, Kiseleva was a prostitute. She later became a spiritual daughter of her confessor John of Kronstadt. She worshiped and lived under monastic discipline at Saint Andrew's Cathedral, Kronstadt before moving from Kronstadt to Oranienbaum in 1895, where the center of the Ioannites' functioning moved after it.

== The Ioannites ==
The Ioannites considered Kiseleva a prophetess and called her "the Theotokos of the Tsar of Tsars", since the Ioannites called Jesus Christ "the Tsar of Tsars", and "the Oranienbaum Mother of God". Other Ioannites took biblical names: Mikhail Petrov, a Yaroslavl peasant, took the name "Archangel Michael"; Elizaveta Korchacheva, a former prostitute, took the name "Salome the Myrrh-bearer"; Nazarii Dmitriev, a Novgorod peasant, took the name "John the Theologian"; Basilii Pustoshkin, the landlord of Kronstadt Hospice, took the name "Elijah"; and Nicholai Bolshakov, a bath attendant, took the name "Enoch".

== Death ==
Kiseleva died of syphilis on 25 November 1905. The place of Kisseleva's burial in Oranienbaum is the subject of special veneration by the Ioannites and sand from the grave is of religious significance for them.

== Legacy ==
Kiseleva is glorified by Ioannites in special hymns in honor of her, for example:

"Virgo is wise Porfira,
You suffered for Christ,
You had in oneself
A high-valued Christ's stone."

Ioannites depict Kiseleva in art and on icons, with the icons being rendered equal with other sacred images.

After the death of John of Kronstadt, in 1912 the Holy Synod of the Russian Orthodox Church condemned the Ioannites and declared them a sect; Kiseleva was declared a main sectarian. The sect in official documents was named "Kiselevists" from the name of Kiseleva.

Victor Protopopov wrote the play "Black Crows" in 1905, in which John of Kronstadt is portrayed as a pseudo-healer, and the Ioannites, led by Kiseleva, as fanatics. The Ioannites protested the play and Ekaterina Korchagina-Alexandrovskaya, who played Kiseleva, said "Religious fanatics were furious, and often to me, "in order to avoid excesses", I had to return home after the performance, accompanied by guards, who protected me from sectarian attempts to crack down on me when leaving [the] theater".
