= Pühtitsa Convent =

Monastery in Estonia

Coordinates: 59°12′09″N 27°32′11″E

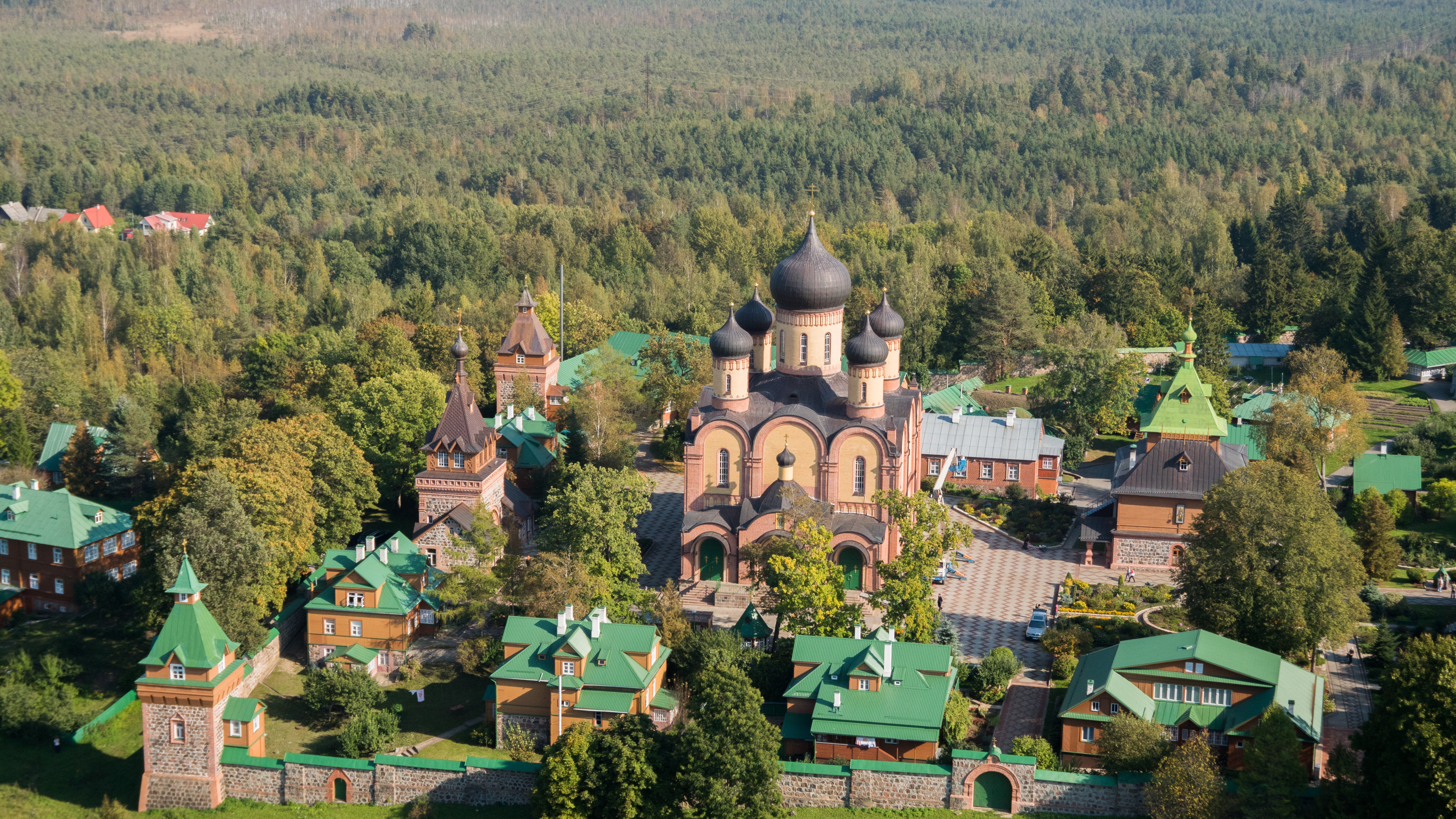
A bird's-eye view of the monastery grounds

Pühtitsa Convent (Estonian: Kuremäe Jumalaema Uinumise nunnaklooster, Russian: Пюхтицкий Успенский женский монастырь) is a Russian Orthodox convent in Eastern Estonia (Ida-Viru County) between Lake Peipus and the Gulf of Finland. A small Orthodox Christian church was built in Pühtitsa in the 16th century. The convent was founded in 1891 and is one of the largest Orthodox monastic communities in the Baltic states.

== History ==
The convent is located on a site known as Pühitsetud ("blessed" in Estonian) according to Orthodox tradition. According to a legend, a shepherd from the village of Kuremäe witnessed a divine revelation near a spring of water to this day venerated as holy. Later in the 16th century, locals found an ancient icon of Dormition of the Mother of God under a huge oak tree. The icon still belongs to the convent.

In 1888, the Russian Orthodox Church sent a nun from the Ipatiev Monastery in Kostroma to establish a convent in Pühtitsa. The katholikon was built to Mikhail Preobrazhensky's designs in the Russian Revival style. It was consecrated in 1910.

There are six churches in the convent dedicated to a number of Orthodox Christian Saints such as St. Sergius of Radonezh, St. Simeon the Receiver of God, Saint Nicholas, St. Anna the Prophetess and others. Prince Sergei Shakhovskoy, Governor of Estland, supported the establishment of the convent during a period of increasing Orthodox institutional development in the region. It was the first Orthodox monastery built in Estonia (to the delight of mostly Orthodox local peasants of Jõhvi county).

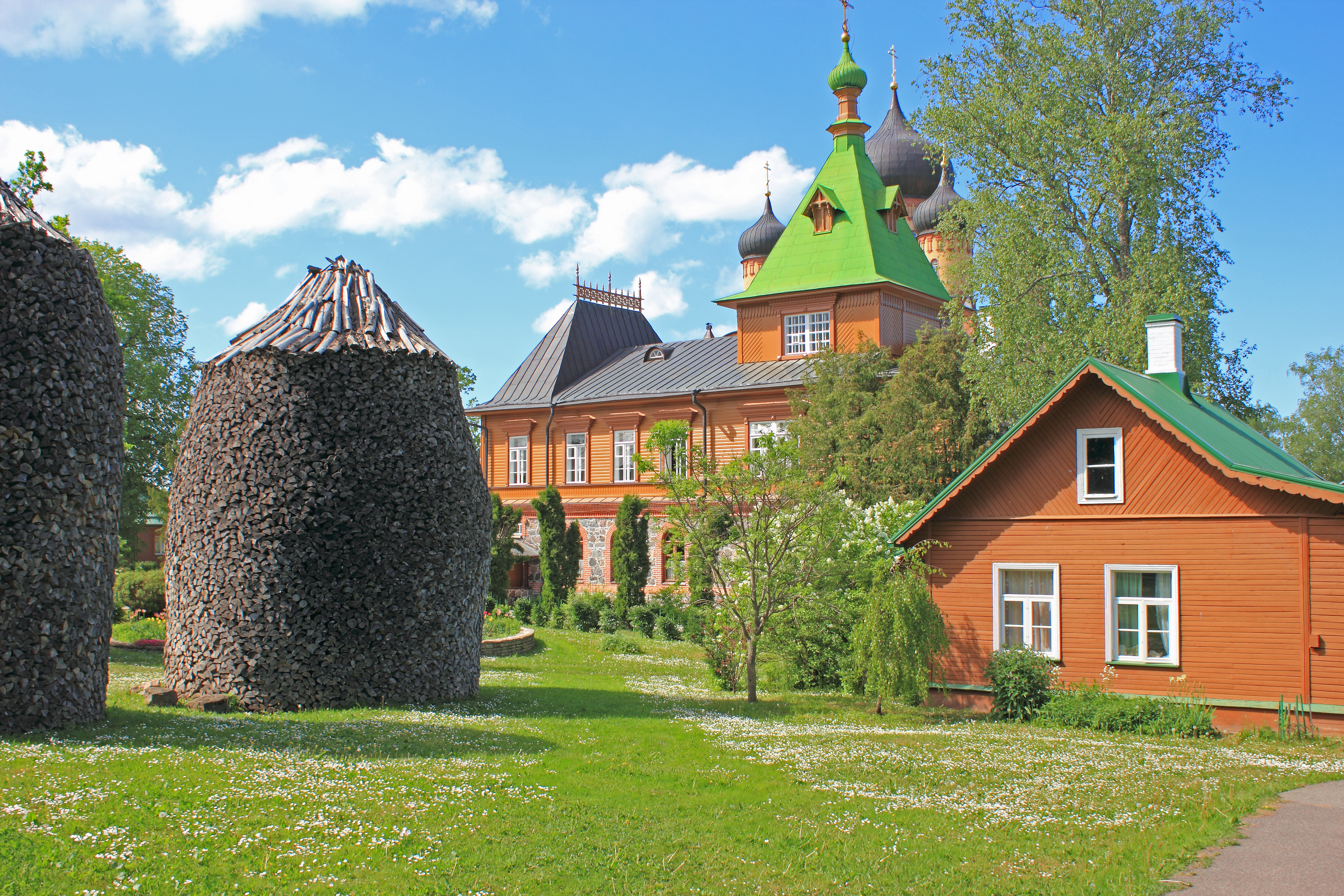
The monastery yard features a number of 20-feet-high firewood stacks

In 1919, After Estonia became independent, the state confiscated much of the convent's land, and the convent came under the jurisdiction of the Estonian Apostolic Orthodox Church, independent of Moscow. During the Second World War, the battlefront was at times only a few kilometres away from the convent, and the Germans organized a concentration camp for Russian prisoners of war inside the monastery compound.

Following the Soviet reoccupation of Estonia in 1944, the convent managed to survive despite the uneasy co-existence with the Communist authorities. Patriarch Alexius II who was the bishop (later the archbishop) of Tallinn and Estonia in the 1960s was instrumental in the fight to keep the convent from closure.

The Pühtitsa Convent and the Pskov-Caves Monastery were the only monasteries in the Soviet Union that did not suspend their activities throughout the 20th century. By 1991, the Pühtitsa monastic community consisted of 161 nuns. In 1990 it was placed under the direct authority of the Patriarch of Moscow and All Russia.

== See also ==
- List of Christian religious houses in Estonia
- Ioannovsky Convent
