= Andreyan Zakharov =

Russian architect (1761–1811)

- Андреян Захаров
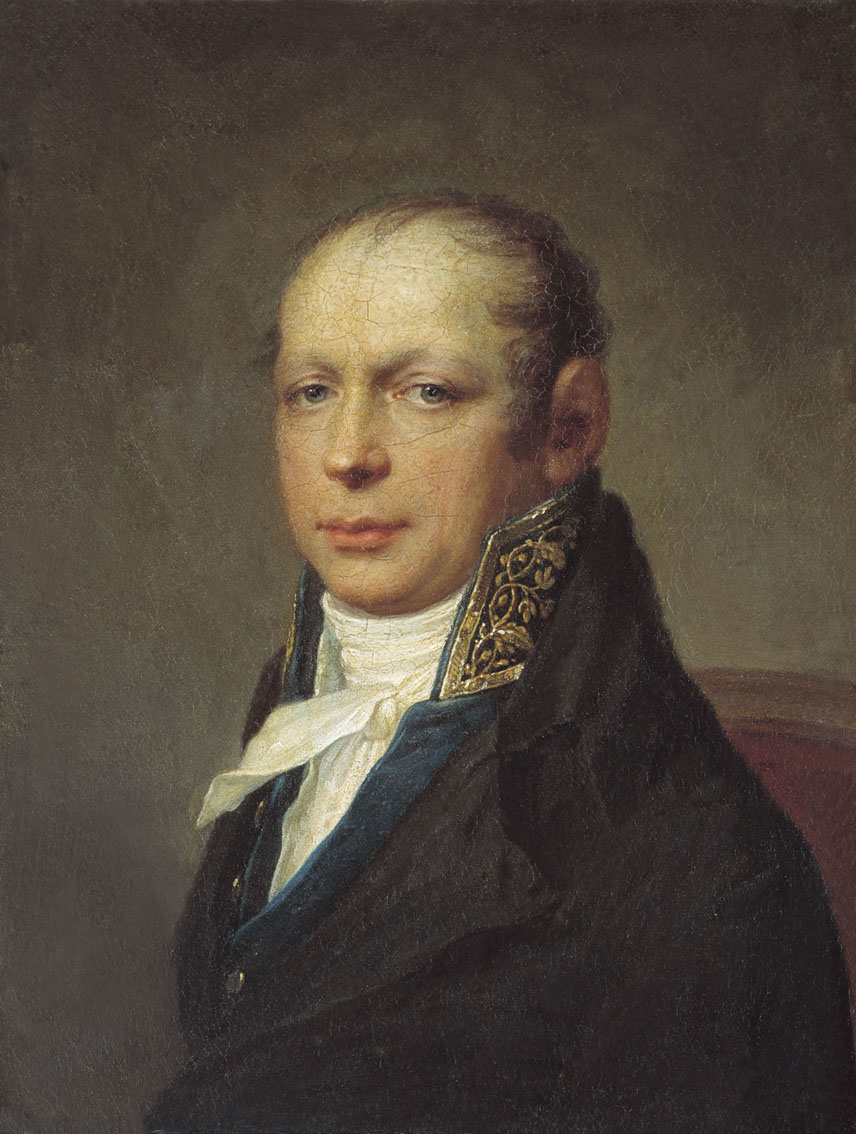
- Portrait by Stepan Shchukin (c. 1804)
- Born: August 8, 1761; Saint Petersburg, Russia
- Died: August 27, 1811 (aged 50); Saint Petersburg, Russia
- Education: Member Academy of Arts (1894)
- Alma mater: Imperial Academy of Arts (1782)
- Known for: Architecture
- Awards: Big Gold Medal of the Imperial Academy of Arts (1782)

Andreyan Dmitriyevich Zakharov (Russian: Андреян Дмитриевич Захаров; 19 August 1761 – 8 September 1811) was a Russian architect and representative of the Empire style. His designs also alternated neoclassicism with eclecticism.

Zakharov was born and died in Saint Petersburg. He was a member of a family employed by the Admiralty board, and his greatest work was his renovation and expansion of the Admiralty building. He studied in the Petersburg Academy of Fine Arts from 1767 to 1782 with Alexander Kokorinov and Ivan Starov, and then in Paris from 1782 to 1786 with Jean-François Chalgrin. In 1794, he became a full Academician at the Petersburg Academy of Fine Arts. In addition to the Admiralty building, he constructed several buildings in Gatchina and other towns neighboring Saint Petersburg.

== The Admiralty ==
In 1805, Zakharov was appointed Chief Architect of the Department of the Navy. His focus was on conducting the management of buildings; including the design, and construction of civil, and industrial buildings. Reconstruction of the building of the Admiralty became the first task of the architect at this post.

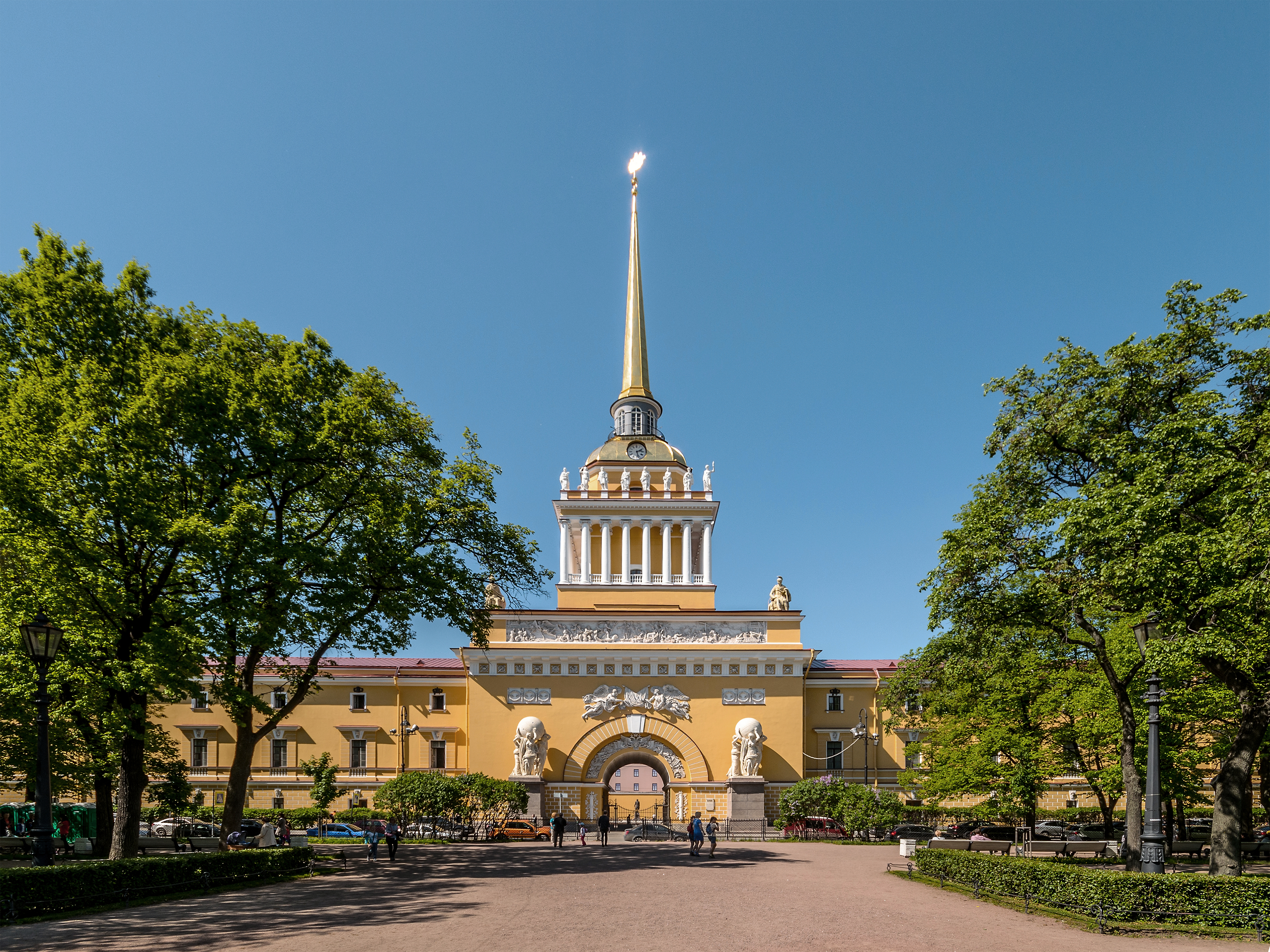
The central tower of the Admiralty, Saint Petersburg.

The Admiralty building in Saint Petersburg is the greatest monument of Russian architecture in the Empire style. It is a symbol of the Saint Petersburg and is the architectural center of the city. Zakharov preserved the plan configuration of the preexisting building, the initial building was of 1738, by architect I. K. Korobov. From 1806 to 1823, Zakharov created a new, grandiose construction, with the main facade extending 407 meters, and a majestic architectural appearance that emphasised its central position in the city with arterials converging from it in three rays. In the center of the building is a monumental spired tower, which became the symbol of the city. Zakharov preserved this old spire by Korobov and flanked it with two new neoclassical wings. The composition of twin winged facades with smooth walls, strongly protruding porticoes, and deep loggias is symmetrically located along the sides of the tower, creating a complex rhythmical alternation of simple and clear volumes.

The building's sculptures added additional value and significance. Decorative reliefs were integrated organically with the large architectural volumes, sculptural groups along the walls emphasise the human scale in contrast to the immensely expanded facades. In the interior of the Admiralties, the vestibule with the main stairway, the meeting halls, and the library were preserved. The austerity of the monumental architectural forms was softened by the abundance of light and by the exceptional refinement of finishing.

== Other work ==
The earliest works by Zakharov were several buildings in Gatchina such as the Lutheran Church of Saint Peter, Gorbaty bridge, Lviniy bridge, and an aviary. The church was designed in a simplified volume with gothic detailing. In addition to the Gatchina projects were the development of Vasilievsky Island in Petersburg, and the reconstruction of the building of the Petersburg Academy of Science in 1803–1804. This was executed in the tradition of the French school of town planning, where the unity of the ensemble was reached by creating a rhythm of the arrangement of buildings with similar architectural details. At this time Zakharov prepared the architectural plans for the Nizhniy Novgorod fair, which were realized by the architect Agustín de Betancourt in the following years.

Zakharov created projects for developing buildings on Proviantskii island (1806–1808) and Gakernyi port (1806–1809), a number of projects for Kronstadt (St. Andrew's Cathedral, built in 1806–1817, which has since been demolished), projects for public structures and churches for the provinces, counties, and cities of Russia with a pronouncedly monumental disposition. The cathedrals in Dnipropetrovsk and Izhevsk both derive from Zakharov's cathedral in Kronstadt. Beginning in 1787 he taught at the Academy of Fine Arts, and among his students was the architect A. I. Melnikov.

== Buildings ==
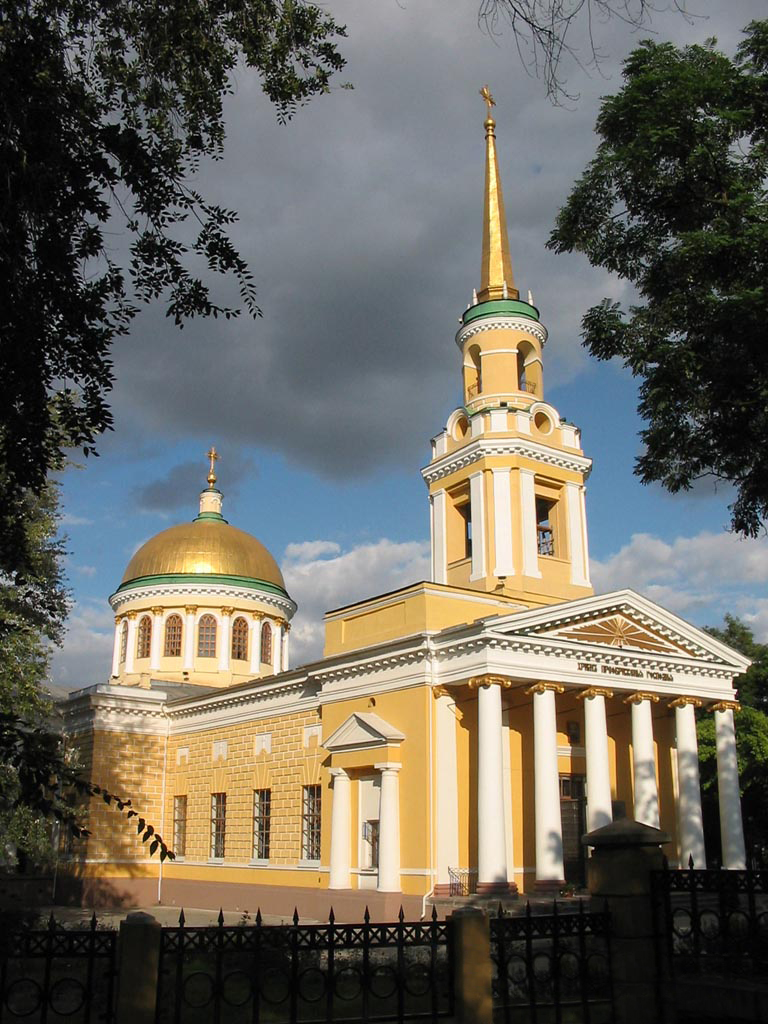
Saviour Cathedral, Dniptopetrovsk

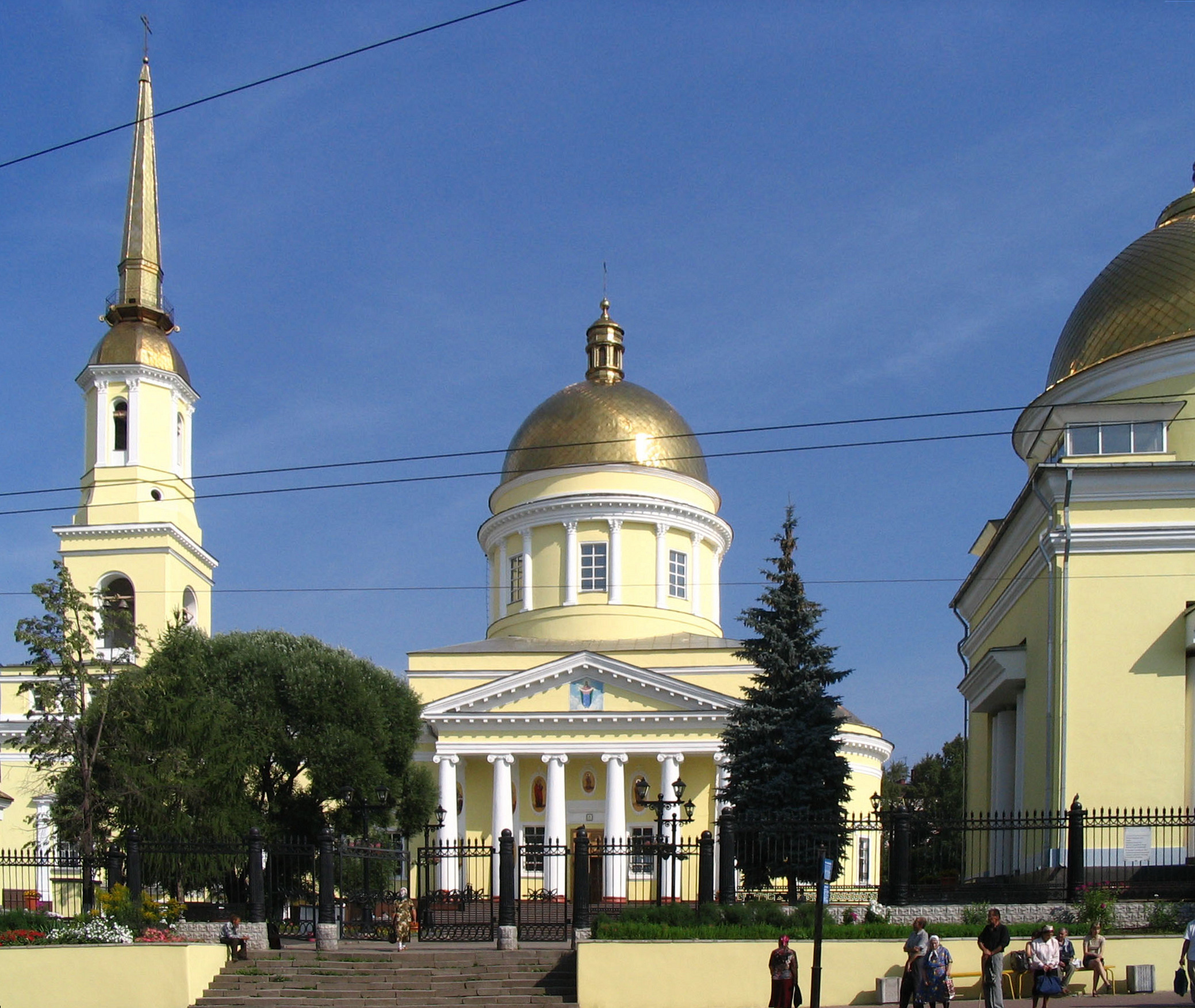
Alexander Nevsky Cathedral, Izhevsk

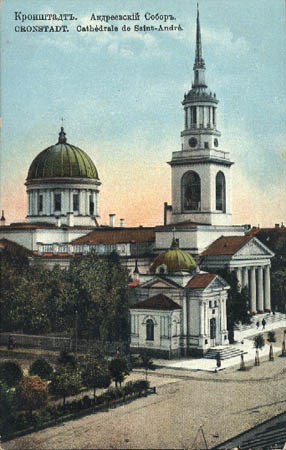
St. Andrew's Cathedral, Kronstadt

== Sources ==
- "Захаров, русские художники" . Brockhaus and Efron Encyclopedic Dictionary (in Russian). 1906.
