= Saint Andrew's Cathedral, Kronstadt =

St. Andrew's Cathedral of Saint Andrew Apostle
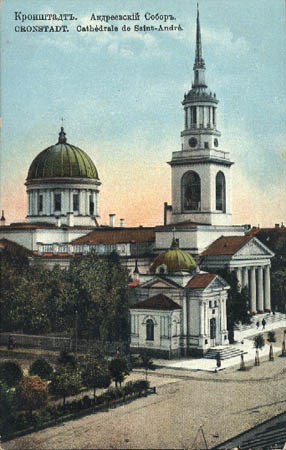

Religion
- Affiliation: Russian Orthodox
- Province: Saint Petersburg
- Status: Destroyed

Location
- Municipality: Kronstadt
- State: Russia
- Interactive map of St. Andrew's Cathedral of Saint Andrew Apostle
- Coordinates: 59.99166°N 29.77750°E

Architecture
- Architects: Charles Cameron (lead architect); Andreyan Zakharov, A.N. Akutin
- Style: Late Empire style
- Groundbreaking: 1805
- Completed: 1817
- Dome: One

St. Andrew's Cathedral was the main Russian Orthodox cathedral of Kronstadt. The church was built in 1805–1817 to Andreyan Zakharov's designs to replace a wooden church dating from 1718. It was dedicated to Andrew the Apostle, the patron saint of the Russian Navy.

Zakharov's elegant design proved influential. It was replicated in Izhevsk (see Alexander Nevsky Cathedral) and in Yekaterinoslav (see Transfiguration Cathedral), among other cities of Imperial Russia.

The Kronstadt Cathedral is highly important for Orthodox believers because Saint John of Kronstadt, one of the greatest saints of Russian Orthodox Church, was the local priest for 53 years.

St. Andrew's Cathedral was demolished under the Soviet regime in 1932. Plans for its rebuilding have been announced.
