= Transfiguration Cathedral, Dnipro =

Eastern Orthodox church in Dnipro, Ukraine

Transfiguration Cathedral
- Saviour's Transfiguration Cathedral
- Спасо-Преображенський кафедральний собор
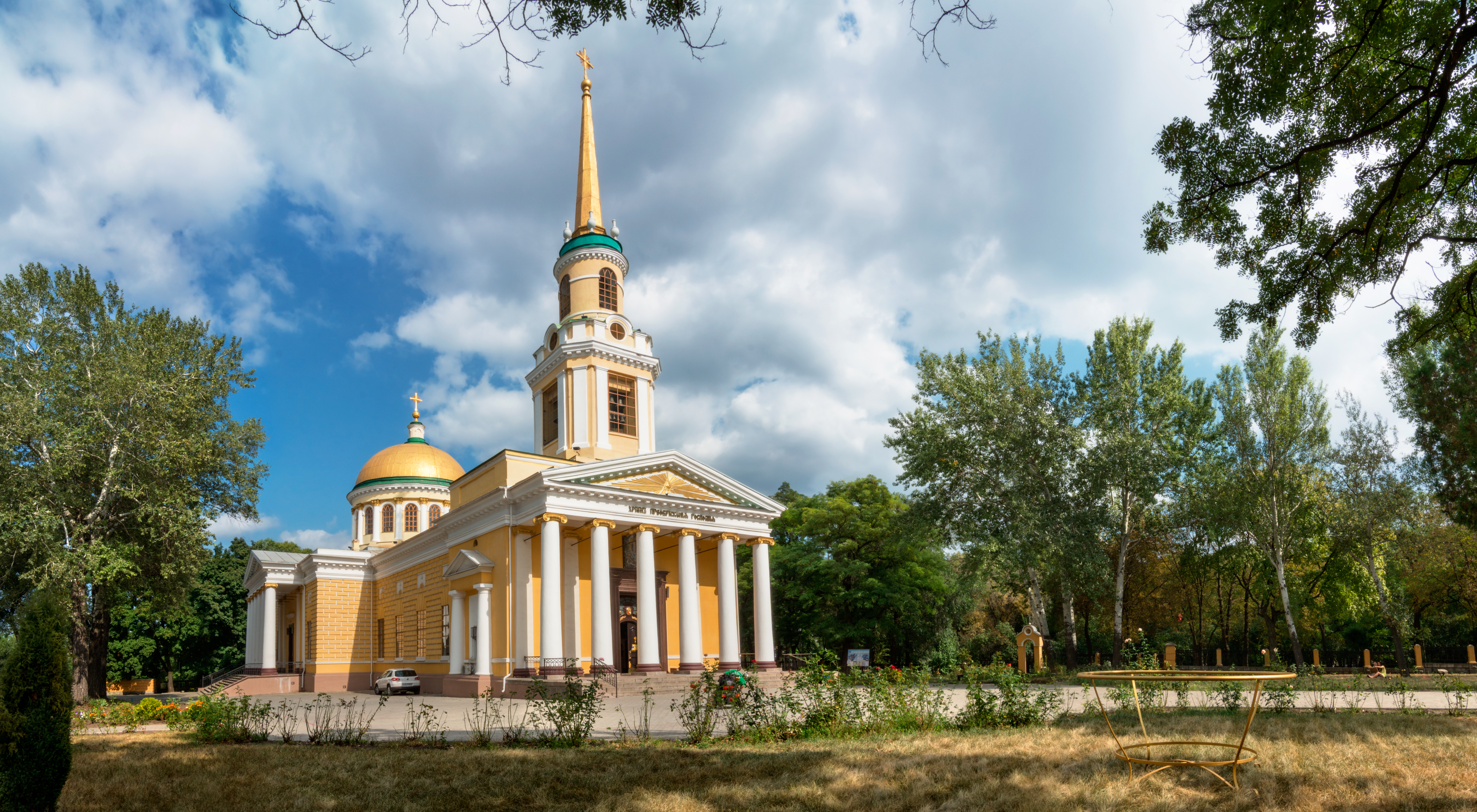
- The cathedral in 2014
- Transfiguration Cathedral
- 48°27′29.71″N 35°03′59.89″E
- Location: Dnipro
- Address: 1 Soborna Square
- Country: Ukraine
- Denomination: Eastern Orthodoxy

History
- Status: Active
- Founded: 1786
- Founder: Grigory Potemkin
- Dedication: Transfiguration of Jesus
- Consecrated: 1835

Architecture
- Functional status: Metropolitan Cathedral
- Architectural type: Cathedral
- Style: Neoclassical
- Years built: 1787–1835
- Completed: 1835

Administration
- Archdiocese: Ukrainian Orthodox Church

Immovable Monument of National Significance of Ukraine
- Official name: Преображенський собор (Transfiguration Cathedral)
- Type: Architecture
- Reference no.: 040040

The Saviour's Transfiguration Cathedral (Ukrainian: Спасо-Преображенський кафедральний собор; Russian: Спасо-Преображенский собор) is the main Orthodox church of Dnipro, Ukraine. It is one of the cathedrals of the Dnipropetrovsk Diocese (previously Katerynoslav) of the Ukrainian Orthodox Church, the cathedral was dedicated in remembrance of the Transfiguration of the Lord.

== Design ==
The notion that the city's principal structure, the Transfiguration Cathedral, ought to have been constructed in accordance with the plans of St. Peter's Basilica in Rome has been deeply ingrained in Dnipro literature for over 200 years. The cathedral was considered a broad emblem of the vast socioeconomic and cultural changes occurring in the recently joined Southern Territory of the Russian Empire.

The National Russian Military Historical Archive in Moscow is home to the original Transfiguration Cathedral projects. It is thought that Claude Gerua, an architect, owns them. The cathedral is an imposing basilica with five naves. The cathedral is adorned with porticoes, which include an eight-column Corinthian order portico on the main façade and six-column porticoes on the side facades, in addition to the enormous dome that above the house. An inscription-adorned copper gilt mortgage board is set in a particular location in the altar's foundations for the future temple. It was subsequently discovered during the 1830 laying and positioned in the newly laid foundation of the current structure.

The cathedral is designed in a T-shape and was constructed in the Neoclassical style. The front portion of it is enlarged to form two borders, one on the left side honoring the Great Martyr Catherine and the other on the right side honoring Saint Nicholas. A dome rising above the central pre-altar section, each with a diameter exceeding 8 metres (26 ft), are supported by the vault's four rectangular sails. The walls include sixteen elongated windows that display eight biblical prophets. Directly underneath are pictures of the four evangelists, Matthew, Mark, Luke, and John, painted on the vaults.

== History ==
In both of the city's first master designs, the notion of a grand temple serving as the center of the new Katerynoslav was prioritized. The foundation stone was laid on 20 May [O.S. 9 May] 1787 by Russian Empress Catherine II and Austrian Emperor Joseph II, during Catherine's Crimean journey. The event is described in the memoirs of comte de Ségur. Prince Grigory Potemkin envisioned the church as one of the spiritual centres of New Russia. According to accounts at the time, only the cathedral's foundation had been completed by 1787–1789: huge and tiny wild stone had been set with limestone filler, and deep trenches had been constructed. The Russian Empire's national treasury had to pay 71,102 rubles just for this establishment.

Construction was severely delayed by the Russo-Turkish War, which broke out a few months after the cathedral was laid and lasted until 1791. Specifically, financing has all but halted. It should be remembered, nevertheless, that the foundation was constructed during the war, with the major construction completed in the next two years. On 5 October [O.S. 16] 1791, however, with the unexpected death of Potemkin, difficulties arose in the construction of a new Katerynoslav.

It was discovered that the cathedral was constructed simultaneously on two projects following the Potemkin's death. Furthermore, construction officials have already expressed dissatisfaction about their inability to identify the precise tasks that were completed.

On 29 March 1806, Emperor Alexander I ordered the plans were revived and updated by Duc de Richelieu, but construction did not start until 1830. Emperor Alexander I issued an edict on 8 February 1807, to set aside 69,550 rubles and begin work within three years. Under the leadership of Archbishop Gabriel, the cathedral was built on a smaller scale than originally planned, and was consecrated in 1835. The design is attributed to Andreyan Zakharov, chiefly on the ground of its similarity to Zakharov's cathedral in Kronstadt. The building was damaged by an earthquake in 1888 and later by bombs during the Second World War.

When it was built on one of the hills beside the Dnieper, it became a representation of how the steppe area was changing and becoming a city. The cathedral was closed in 1930, and was supposed to be demolished after the 1917 October Revolution to make way for a monument honoring the head of the global proletariat was to be built in its stead. During the Great Patriotic War, the cathedral continued work under the pretense of a museum. Services were temporarily restored here in 1941 with the approval of the German authorities. The diocesan bishops' and clergymen's resting places are currently located on the cathedral grounds, and next to the central gate lies the mass grave of those slain in 1941 in surrounding streets. But eventually, nearly everything in the church was destroyed by fire, including a iconostasis and the bell tower's upper level. As for the church itself, it was converted into the Zorya publishing house's paper storage.

However, historian Dmytro Yavornytsky suggested establishing an atheist museum inside the structure from 1975 and 1988. The cathedral's distinctive iconostasis was kept in its original location on the pretense of historical significance, and the bell, which weighed four hundred beds, was hidden behind the church's gate. The cathedral's grounds housed the Museum of Religion and Atheism until 1992.

The cathedral underwent extensive renovation that started in the middle of the 1990s and was completed in the first part of the 2000s. The building's façade were all repaired. The goal of interior restoration was to restore the spaces as closely as possible to their original state. On the other hand, a number of retreats were made concurrently, and in particular, some well-preserved mid-19th-century fresco pieces were removed. The temple's interior decor was virtually completely redone. Based on the only surviving early 20th-century photo, the cathedral's iconostasis was repaired. The biggest bell-allebefactor was placed and dedicated in the cathedral in 2008.

== Gallery ==
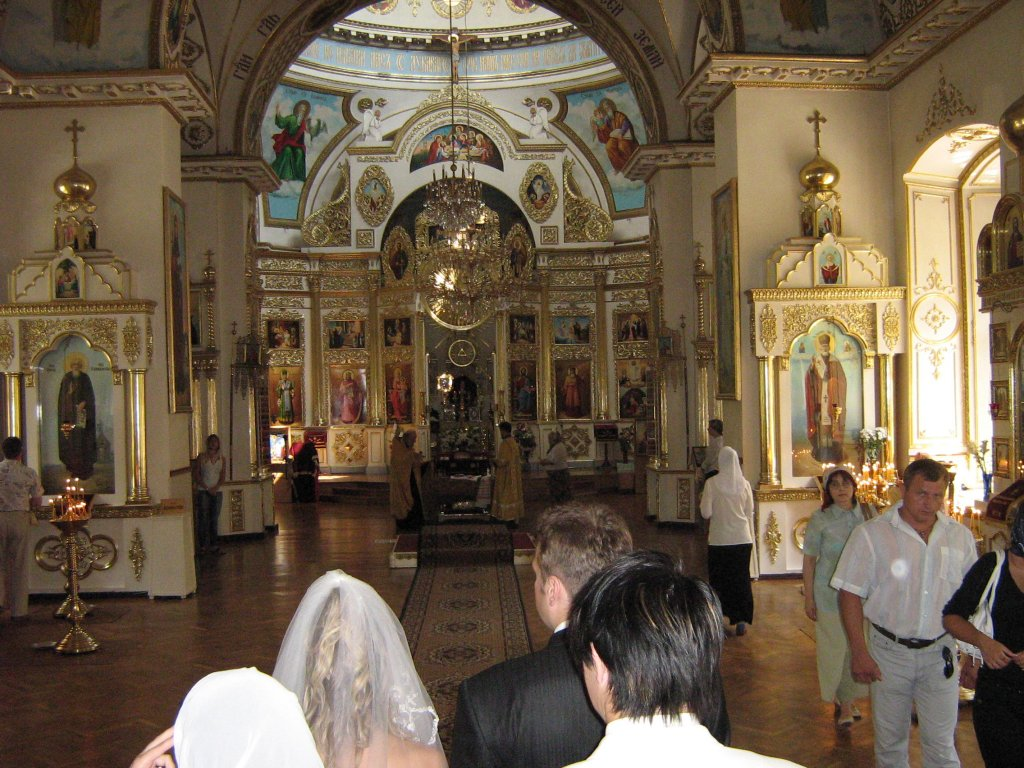
The cathedral's interior in 2007

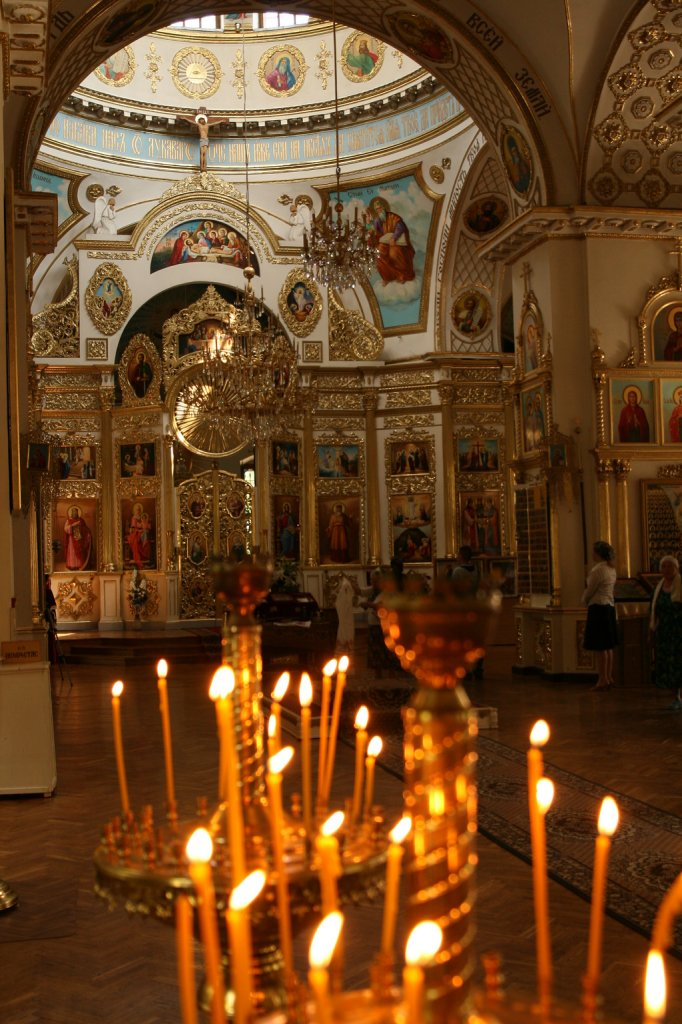
Lit candles inside the cathedral in 2007

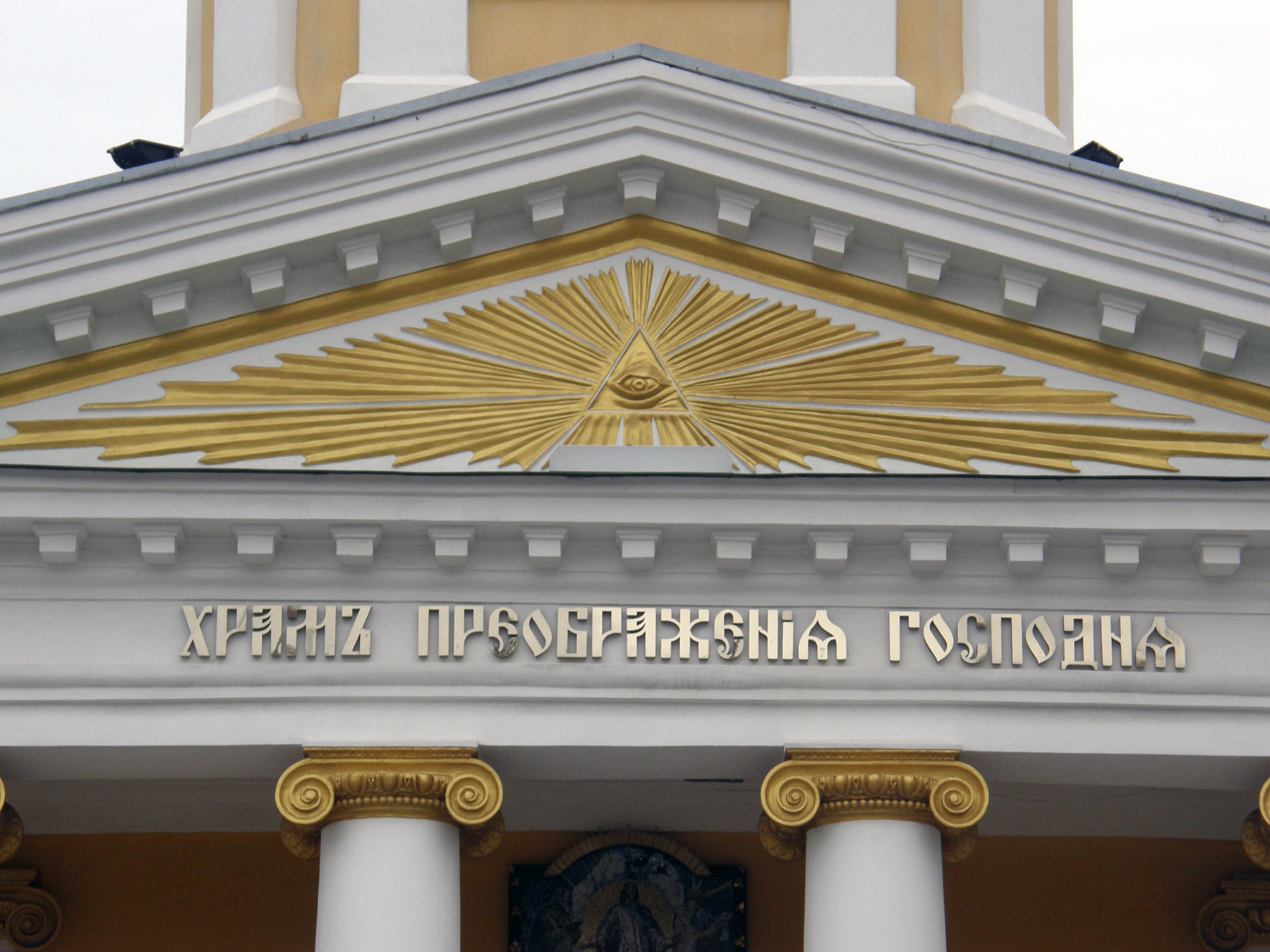
The Eye of Providence on the pediment in 2013

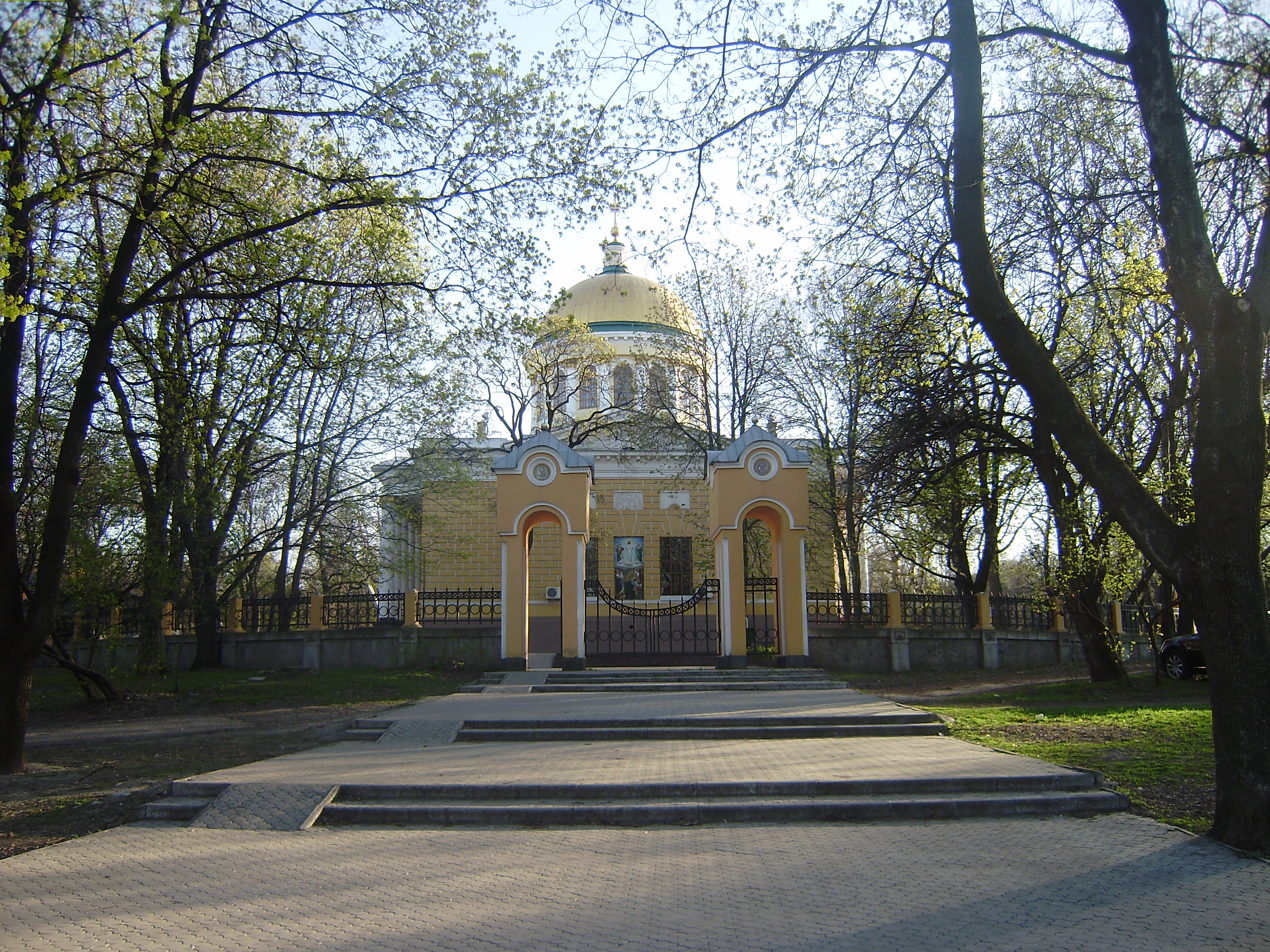
One of the gates to the cathedral's compound in 2013

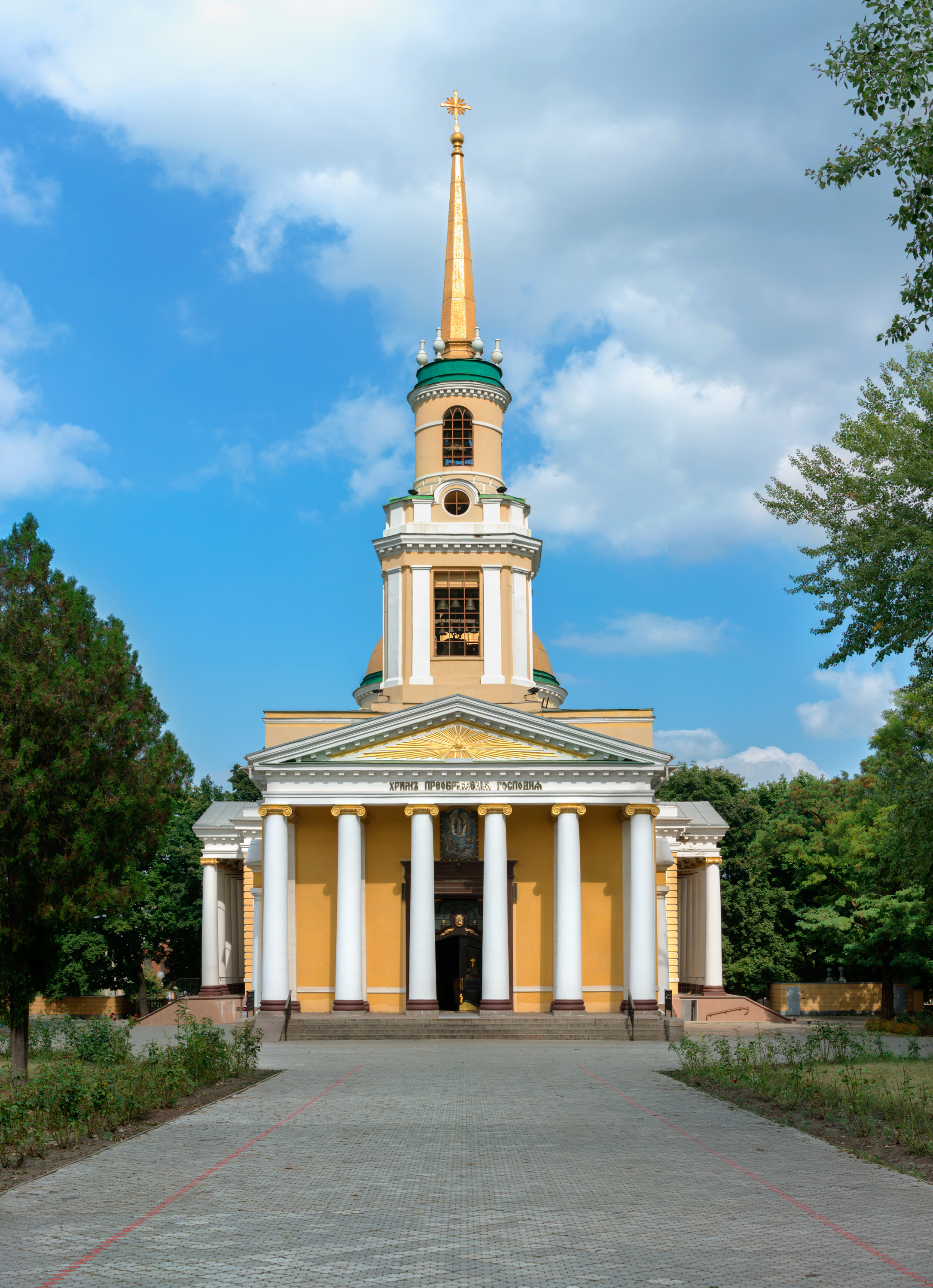
The cathedral's bell tower in 2014

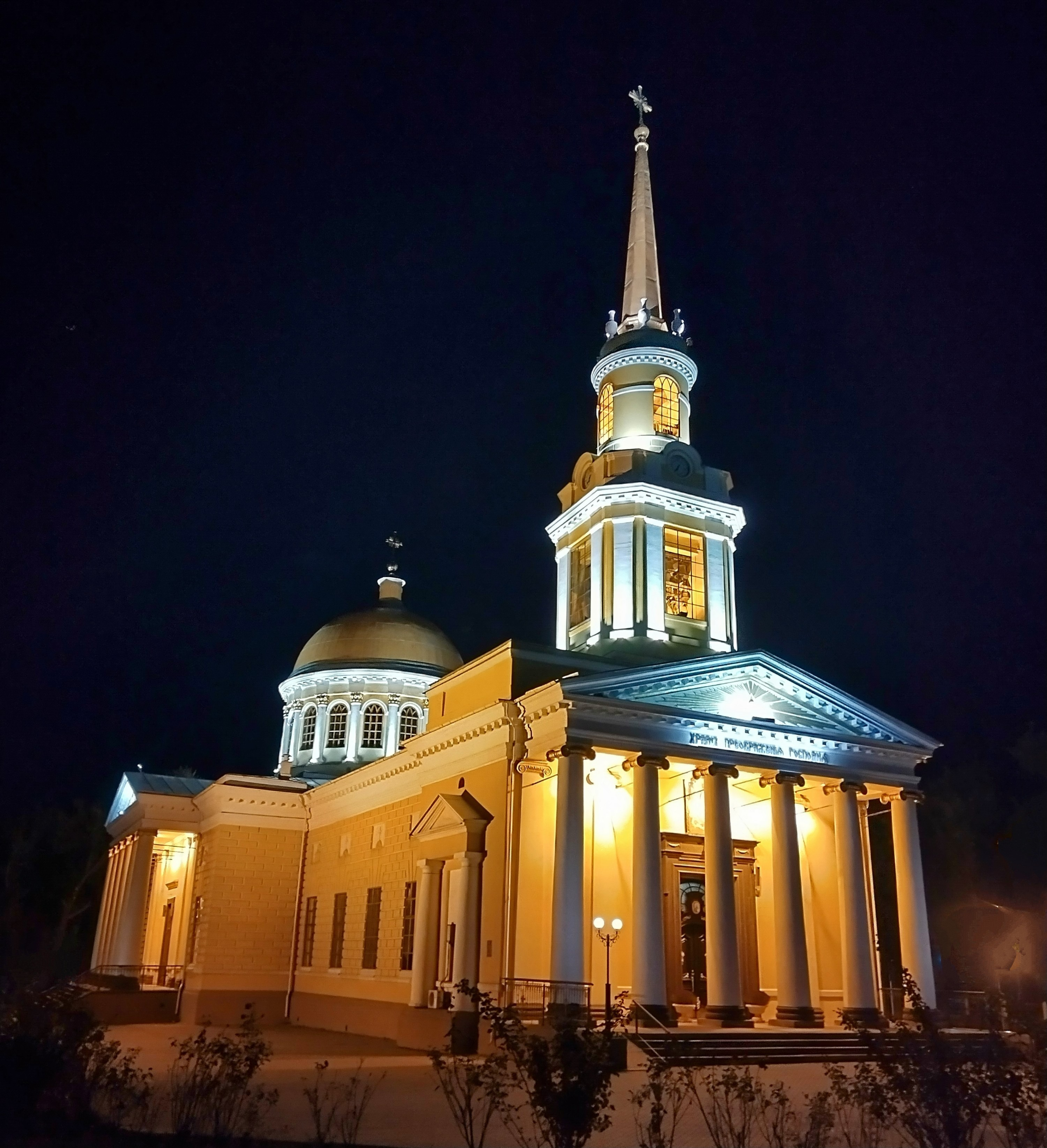
The cathedral as seen at night in 2023
