= Sura, Arkhangelsk Oblast =

Sura Сура
- Selo
- Location within Arkhangelsk Oblast Location within Russia
- Coordinates: 63°34′N 45°38′E
- Country: Russia
- Region: Arkhangelsk Oblast
- District: Pinezhsky District
- Time zone: UTC+3:00

Sura (Russian: Сура) is a rural locality (a selo) and the administrative center of Surskoye Rural Settlement of Pinezhsky District, Arkhangelsk Oblast, Russia. The population was 727 as of 2010. There are 11 streets.

== Geography ==
Sura is located 91 km southeast of Karpogory (the district's administrative centre) by road. Pakhurovo is the nearest rural locality.
