= Sakarias Jaan Leppik =

Estonian clergyman and politician

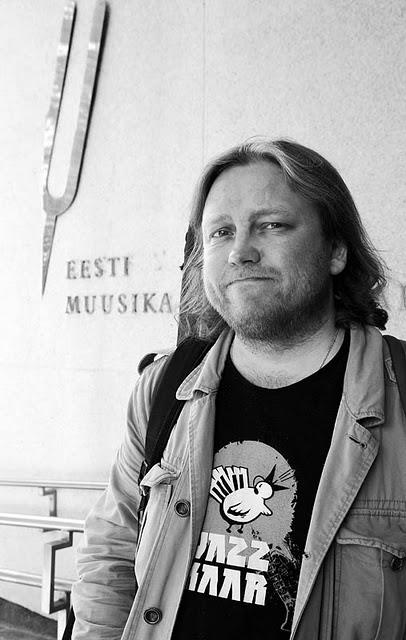
Sakarias Jaan Leppik in 2017

Sakarias Jaan Leppik (born Jaan Leppik; 24 June 1969 Valga) is a priest of the Estonian Apostolic Orthodox Church at the Tallinn Cathedral of the Transfiguration of Our Lord. Musician, composer, thinker, culture analyst, theatre and film critic and journalist.

He studied in Tõrva Secondary School as well as in Tõrva Music School and graduated both in 1987.

During 1987-88 he studied biology at the University of Tartu. During 1991-1996 he was a student of the Institute of Theology of the Estonian Evangelical Lutheran Church in Tallinn. He has also studied political science on courses of the Konrad Adenauer Stiftung, taken media studies at the World Council of Churches, apologetics and history of religion courses at the University of Aarhus, Denmark and studied Greek language at the University of Ioannina, Greece.

During 1999-2003 he was a Member of the Estonian Parliament (Riigikogu). 2003-2005 the Chief Manager of the International Theatre Festival of Tallinn City Theatre. After that he was an editor of foreign economy news in Baltic News Service.

He was the creator of the programme "12th hour" in Estonian TV in 1998. Since 1994 he has been one of the programme creators of the Estonian Public Broadcasting and lately Klassikaraadio. Since 2006 he is a priest of the Orthodox Church of Estonia. Sakarias J. Leppik is also a professional singer of the Emmy-awarded ensemble Vox Clamantis since establishing of it on 1996. He has been member of many Film Festival Jurys, including a Black Nights Film Festival of Tallinn, Nordic Film Days of Lubeck and Molodist Film Festival os Kiew. The Film Journalist of the Year by culture newspaper Sirp. He is an alumnus of the ethnomusicology of the Estonian Academy of Music and Theatre since 2011.

Sakarias Jaan Leppik is married to Marion Leppik, the Communication Manager of the Estonian National Opera. They have two sons.

== Sources ==
- https://web.archive.org/web/20110718021909/http://www.eoc.ee/eng/cat-501/Church/cat-504
- http://ariel.ee/More-about-the-artistic-directors.php
- http://www.voxclamantis.ee
