= Religion in Estonia =

Religion in Estonia (2021 census)
1. No religion (58.6%)
2. Eastern Orthodoxy (16.3%)
3. Lutheranism (7.70%)
4. Other Christians (2.70%)
5. Islam (0.50%)
6. Estonian Neopaganism (0.50%)
7. Buddhism (0.20%)
8. Other religions (0.90%)
9. Undeclared (12.7%)

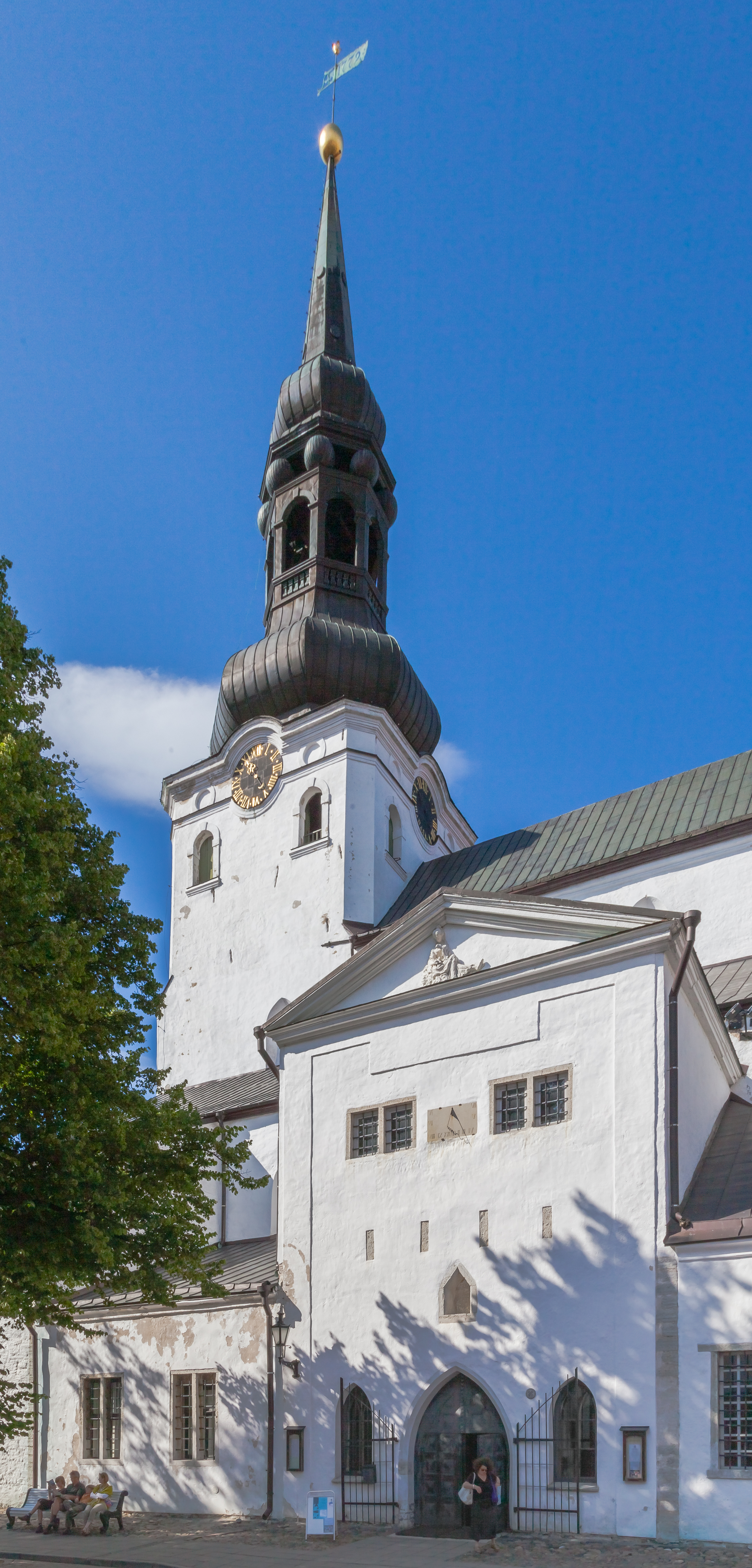
St Mary's Cathedral in Tallinn, a national cultural monument

Estonia, historically a Lutheran Christian nation, is today one of the least religious countries in the world in terms of declared attitudes, with only 14 percent of the population declaring religion to be an important part of their daily life.

== Description ==
The religious population is predominantly Christian and includes followers of 90 affiliations. According to the Estonian Council of Churches data from December 2019, 13.8 percent of the population belong to the Estonian Evangelical Lutheran Church, while 13.1 percent belong to the Estonian Orthodox Church of Moscow Patriarchate (EOCMP), and 2.3 percent belong to the Estonian Apostolic Orthodox Church. The Union of Free Evangelical and Baptist Churches of Estonia and the Catholic Church in Estonia together comprise 1 percent of the population. Other Christian groups, including Jehovah’s Witnesses, Pentecostals, Methodists, Seventh-day Adventists, and Russian Old Believers, collectively constitute 1.1 percent of the population.

According to Ringo Ringvee, "religion has never played an important role on the political or ideological battlefield" and the "tendencies that prevailed in the late 1930s for closer relations between the state and Lutheran church were ended with the Soviet occupation in 1940". He further states that "the chain of religious traditions was broken in most families" under the Soviet policy of state atheism. Before the Second World War, Estonia was approximately 80 percent Protestant and overwhelmingly Lutheran, partly because of historic Swedish rule. Under Russian and Soviet rule, this predominance greatly decreased, while Eastern Orthodoxy increased due to immigration of Russians.

Between 2001 and 2011 census, Eastern Orthodoxy overtook Lutheranism to become the largest Christian denomination in the country due to increasing lack of affiliation and very few conversions among Estonians, as well as due to steady or even increased religious affiliation among the Russian-speaking minorities. Lutheranism still remains the most popular religious group among ethnic Estonians (11 percent of them are Lutherans while also 2 percent of them are Orthodox), while Eastern Orthodoxy is practised mainly by the mostly non-indigenous Slavic minorities (approximately 45 per cent of them are Orthodox). According to the University of Tartu, irreligious Estonians are not necessarily atheists; instead, the 2010s have witnessed a growth of Neopagan, Buddhist and Hindu beliefs among those who declare themselves to be "not religious".

== History ==
In the 13th century, the Teutonic Knights brought Western Christianity to Estonia as part of the Livonian Crusade and during the Protestant Reformation, the Lutheranism became the established church. Before the Second World War, Estonia was approximately 80% Protestant; overwhelmingly Lutheran, with individuals adhering to Calvinism, as well as other Protestant branches. Robert T. Francoeur and Raymond J. Noonan write that "In 1925, the church was separated from the state, but religious instruction remained in the schools and clergymen were trained at the Faculty of Theology at Tartu University. With the Soviet occupation and the implementation of anti-Christian legislation, the church lost over two thirds of its clergy. Work with children, youth, publishing, and so on, was banned, church property was nationalized, and the Faculty of Theology was closed." Aldis Purs, a professor of history at the University of Toronto writes that in Estonia, as well as Latvia, some evangelical Christian clergy attempted to resist the Soviet policy of state atheism by engaging in anti-regime activities such as Bible smuggling. The text titled World and Its Peoples: Estonia, Latvia, Lithuania, and Poland, published by the Marshall Cavendish, states that in addition to the Soviet antireligious campaign in Estonia, which mandated the confiscation of church property and deportation of theologians to Siberia, many "churches were destroyed in the German occupation of Estonia, from 1941 through 1944, and in World War II (1939–1945)". After the dissolution of the Soviet Union, this antireligious legislation was annulled.

The Tallinn Revival (Effataa ärkamine) was a religious movement in the former USSR that began in Tallinn in 1977, resulting from successful proselytizing by Charismatics among the congregation of the St. Olaf's Church (representatives of the movement later left the church).

Modern Estonian Christian theology often revolves around religious rituals rather than trying to preach to or convert Estonians. Christian religious workers don't have a large social role in most towns.

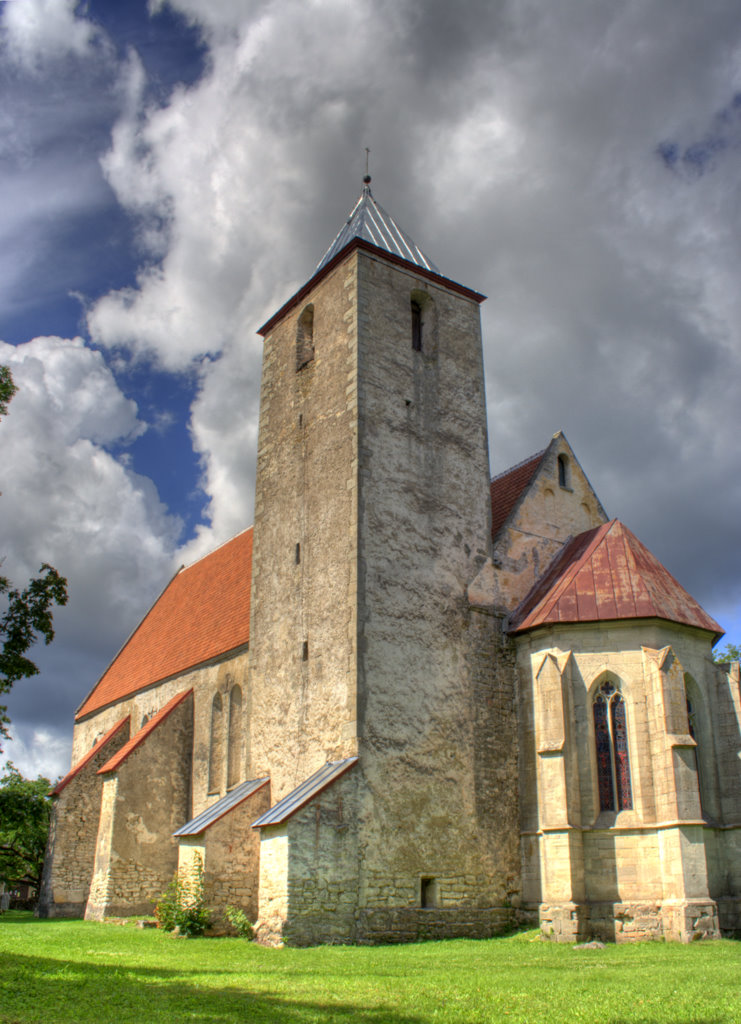
St. Martin's Church of Valjala on the island of Saaremaa, the 13th century oldest church building in Estonia

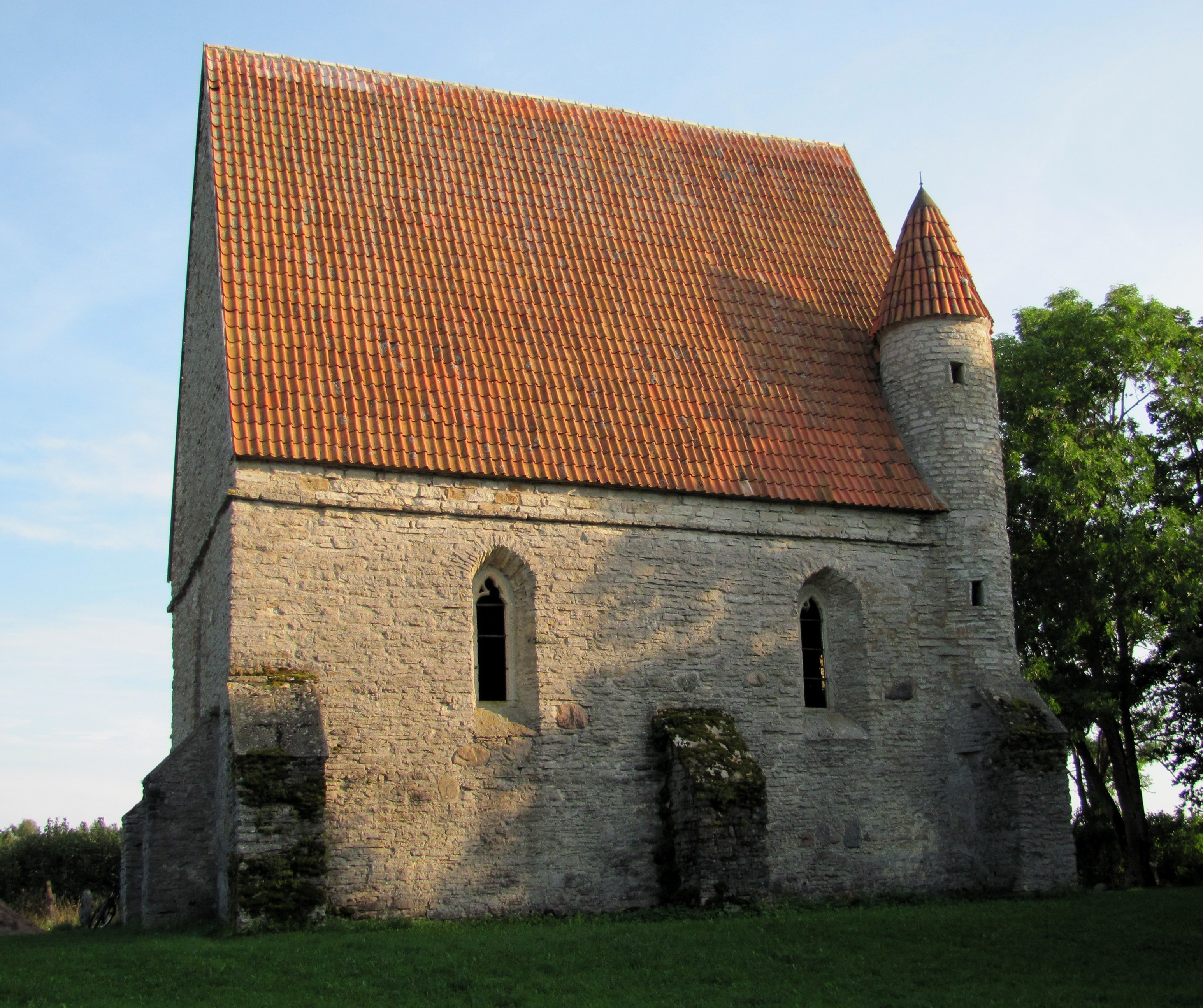
Disused Saha Chapel was established in 13th and rebuilt in 15th century

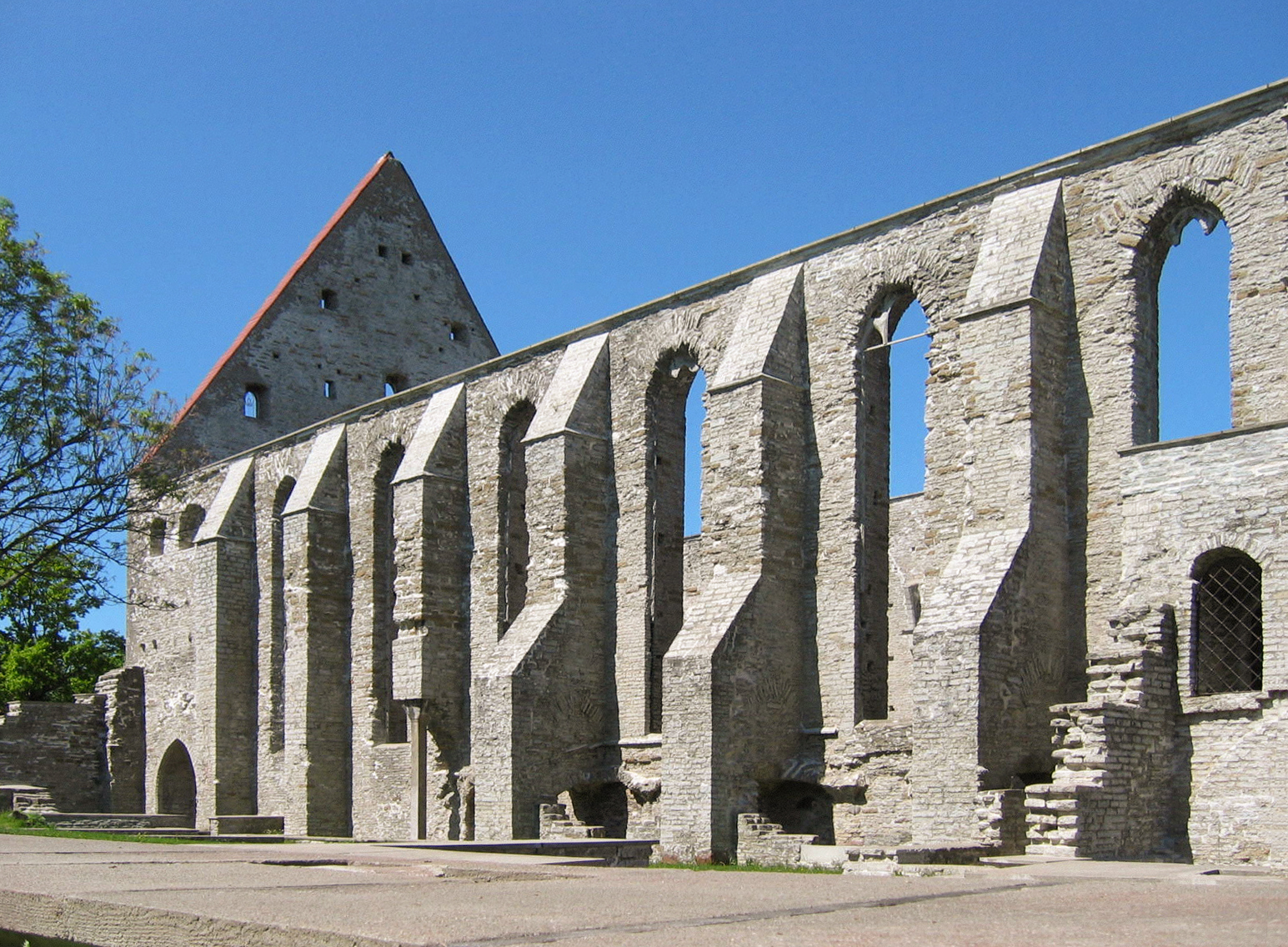
Ruins of the 15th century Catholic Pirita convent

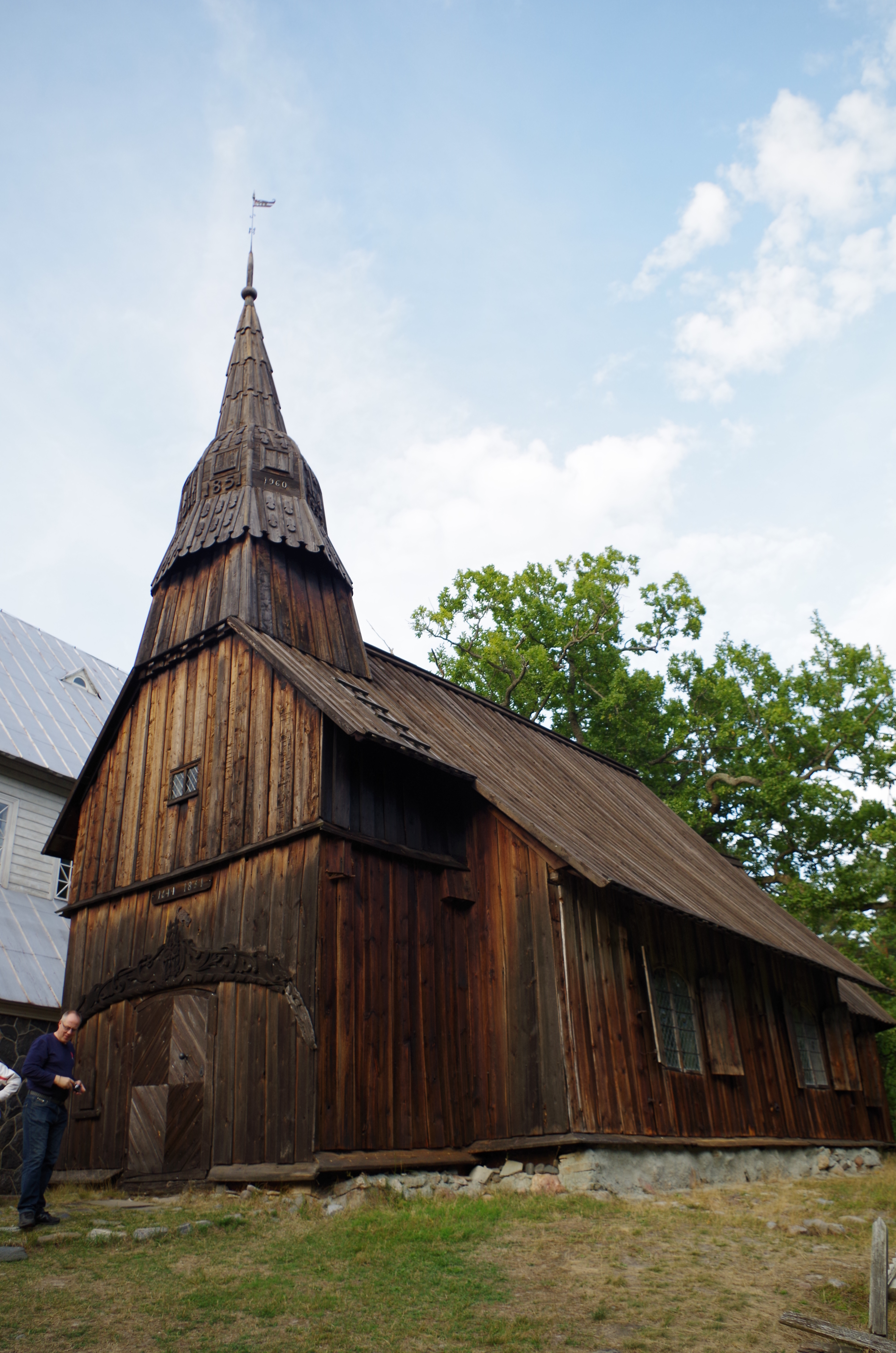
Saint Magdalene Church, Ruhnu, the oldest preserved wooden shrine in Estonia

=== Catholicism ===
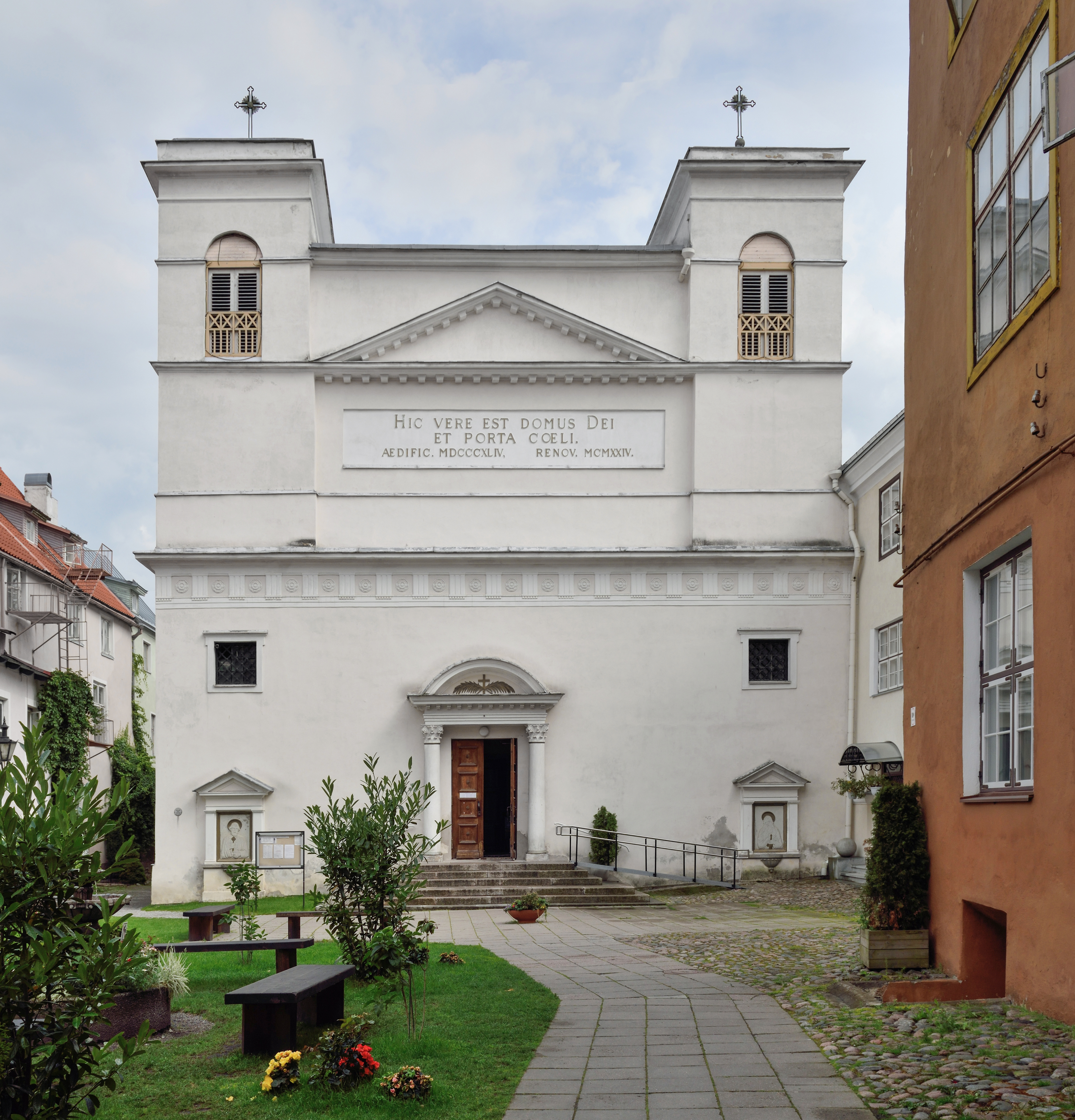
Sts. Peter and Paul's Catholic Cathedral of Tallinn

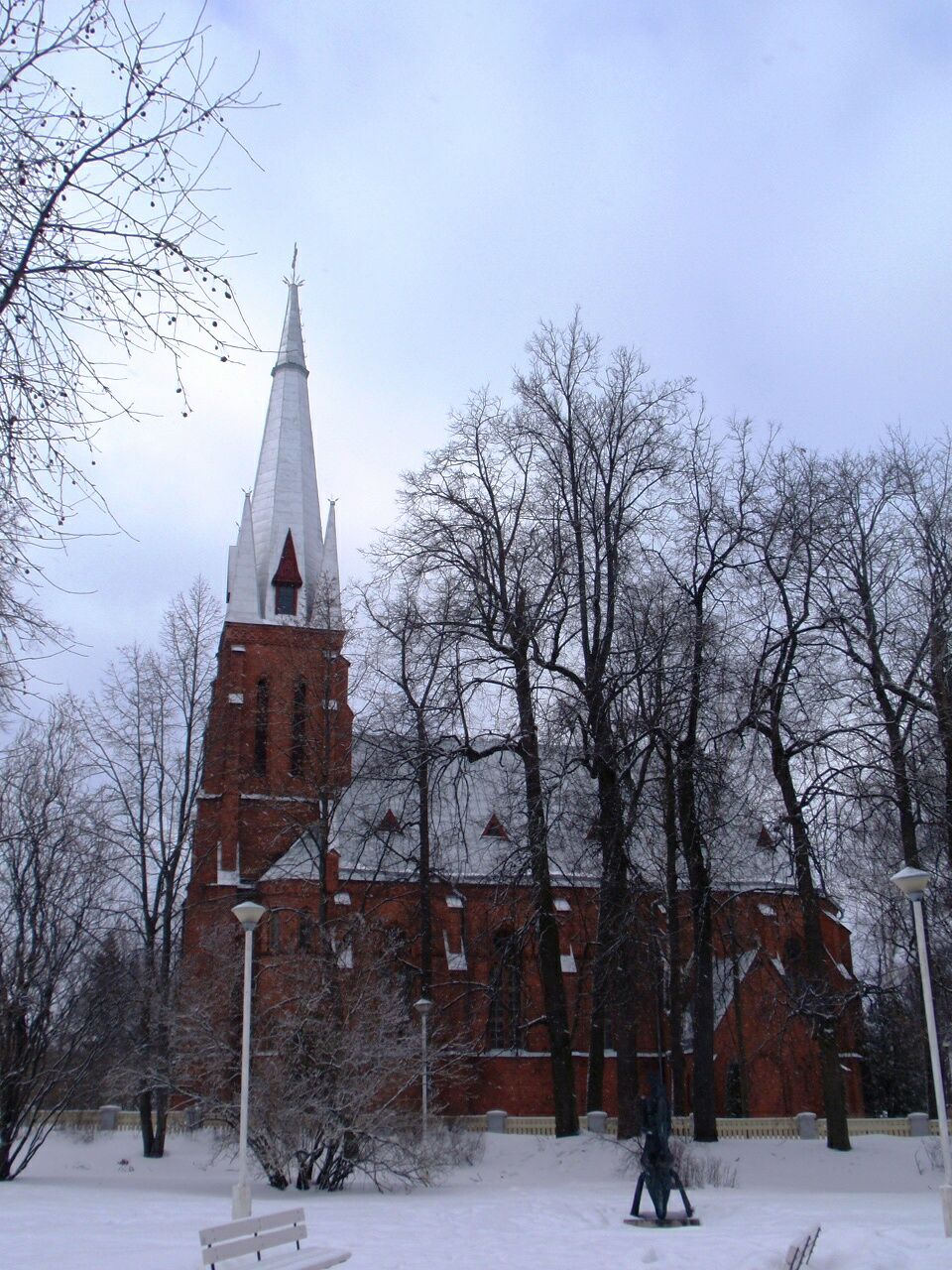
Immaculate Conception Church, Tartu

The Roman Catholic faith became the first official religion in the lands of the Estonians. In the early 13th century, the territory of present-day Estonia was conquered by Danish and German crusaders; this was followed by the Christianization of the Estonians, which was largely completed by 1227.

At the turn of the 20th and 21st century, brothers from Lithuania helped organize a Ukrainian Greek-Catholic parish in Tallinn.

=== Eastern Orthodoxy ===
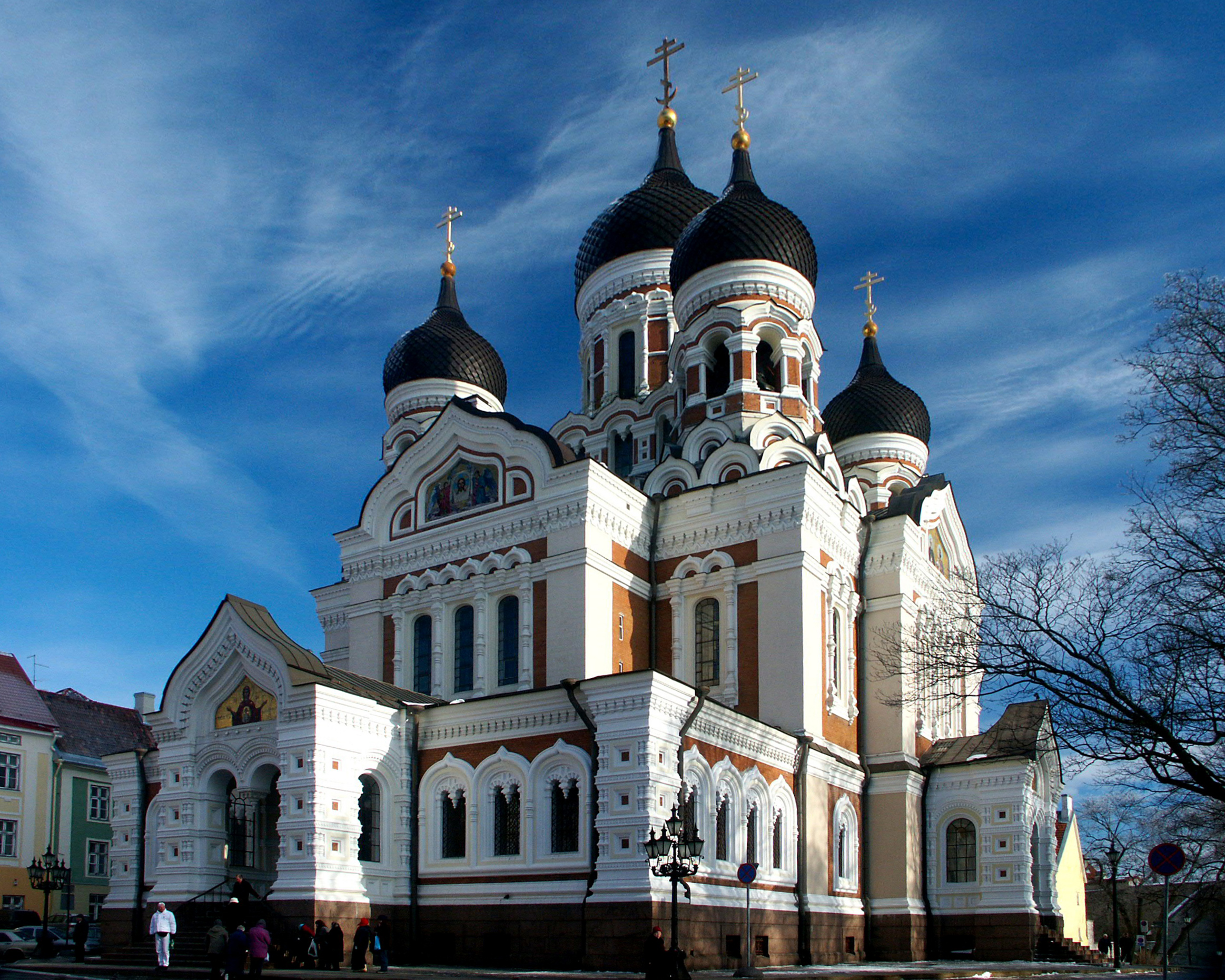
Alexander Nevsky's Cathedral in Tallinn (Russian Orthodox)

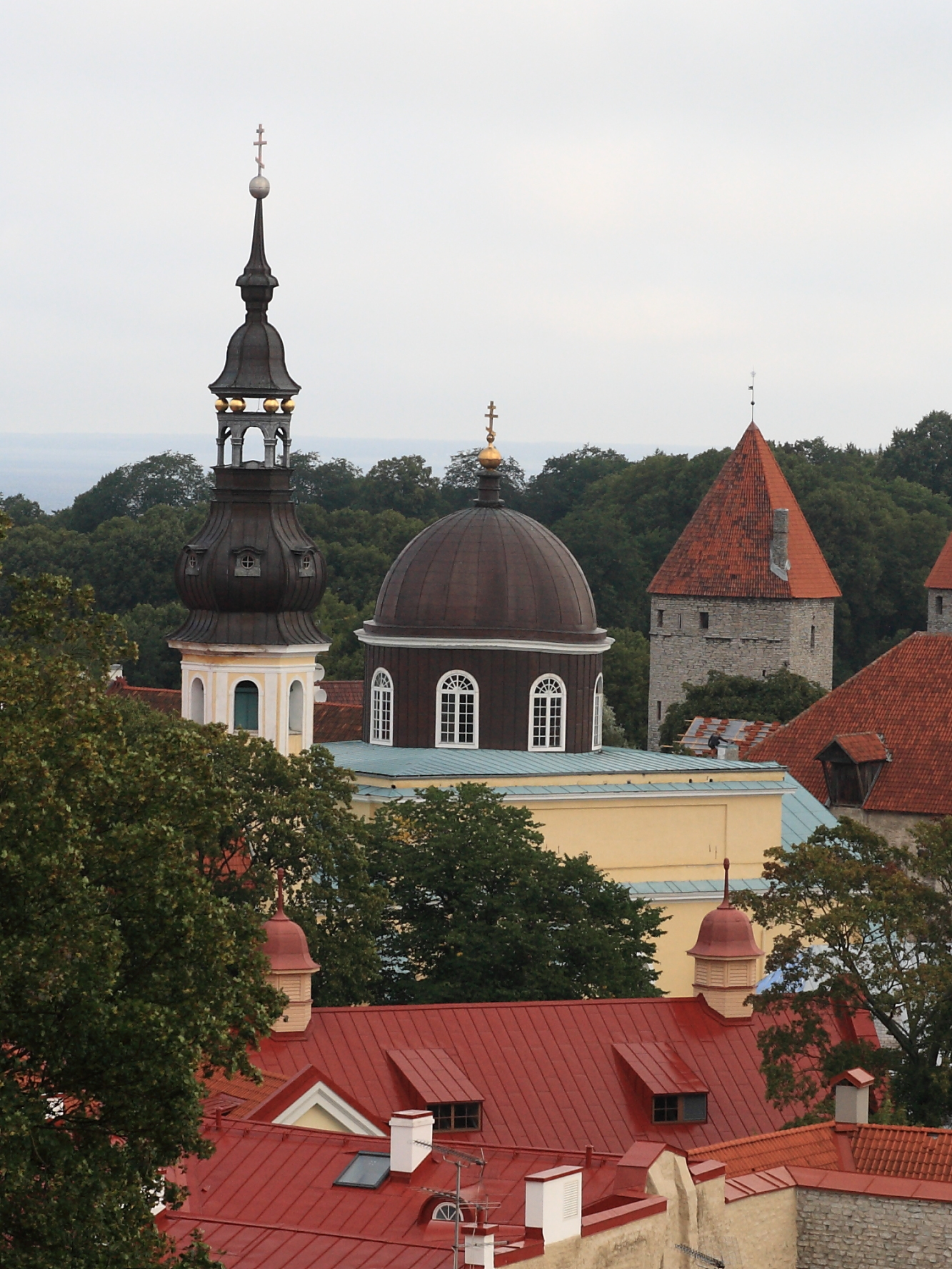
Cathedral of the Transfiguration of Our Lord in Tallinn (Estonian Orthodox)

There were two Orthodox Christian Churches in Estonia, namely the Estonian Orthodox Church, which was part of the Moscow Patriarchate, and the Estonian Apostolic Orthodox Church under Constantinople. The Estonian Ecumenical Patriarchate of Constantinople is a small group which is barely heard of outside Estonia. The membership of the Apostolic Orthodox was about 30,000 in 1996. Since 1840 many Lutherans converted to Orthodox Christianity which resulted in the rise of the Orthodox in Estonia. In 1920, the Apostolic Orthodox Church became autonomous from the Russian Patriarch Tikhon. The reoccupation of Estonia by the Soviet Union ended the autonomy of the Estonian Apostolic Orthodox Church however, the autonomy was regained in 1996 after Estonia regained her independence from the Soviet Union. The number of the Estonian Apostolic Orthodox Church during the Soviet era was about 200,000 out of which 80% were native Estonians.

The division between the two Orthodox Christian churches in Estonia is relative. The Estonian Apostolic Orthodox is dominated by ethnic Estonians whereas the majority of the Estonian Orthodox Church are ethnic Russians. The communication and cooperation between the believers of the two Orthodox communities in Estonia is a social practice and occurs at the individual level.

=== Protestantism ===
==== Lutheranism ====
Lutheranism reached Estonia in 1524, that is during the first years of Reformation, and quickly became the predominant confession. For long time Estonian parishes belonged Sweden or Russian church bodies. The Estonian Evangelical Lutheran Church (EELK) began as result of the First Church Congress in 1917. The Lutheran Church retained its legal status as a religious organization during the Soviet years, albeit subject to certain restrictions.

==== Adventists, Baptists, Moravians, New Apostolics ====
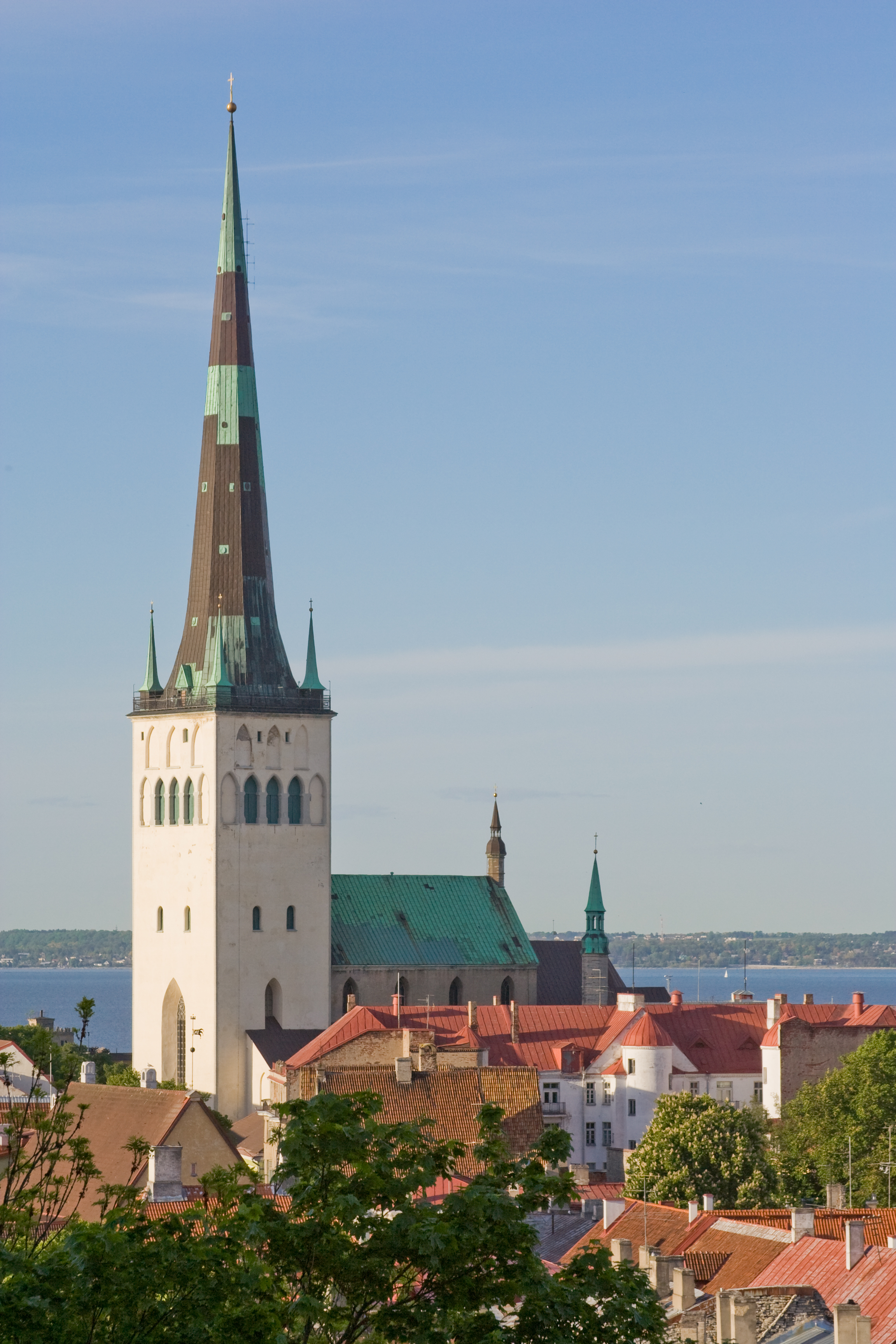
Baptist Church (the formered Catholic and Lutheran St. Olaf's Church) in Tallinn, a national cultural heritage monument

The Moravians began to migrate into Estonia in 1727. The arrival of the Moravian Church in the first half of the 18th century laid the spiritual foundation for the revivals that followed.

In 1884, the German Baptist pastor Adam Schiewe performed the first baptism of faith in Estonia. The Baptist church became one of the fastest growing churches in the years that followed.

The Seventh-Day Adventists started in 1897.

After 1918, the New Apostolic Church appeared in the country.

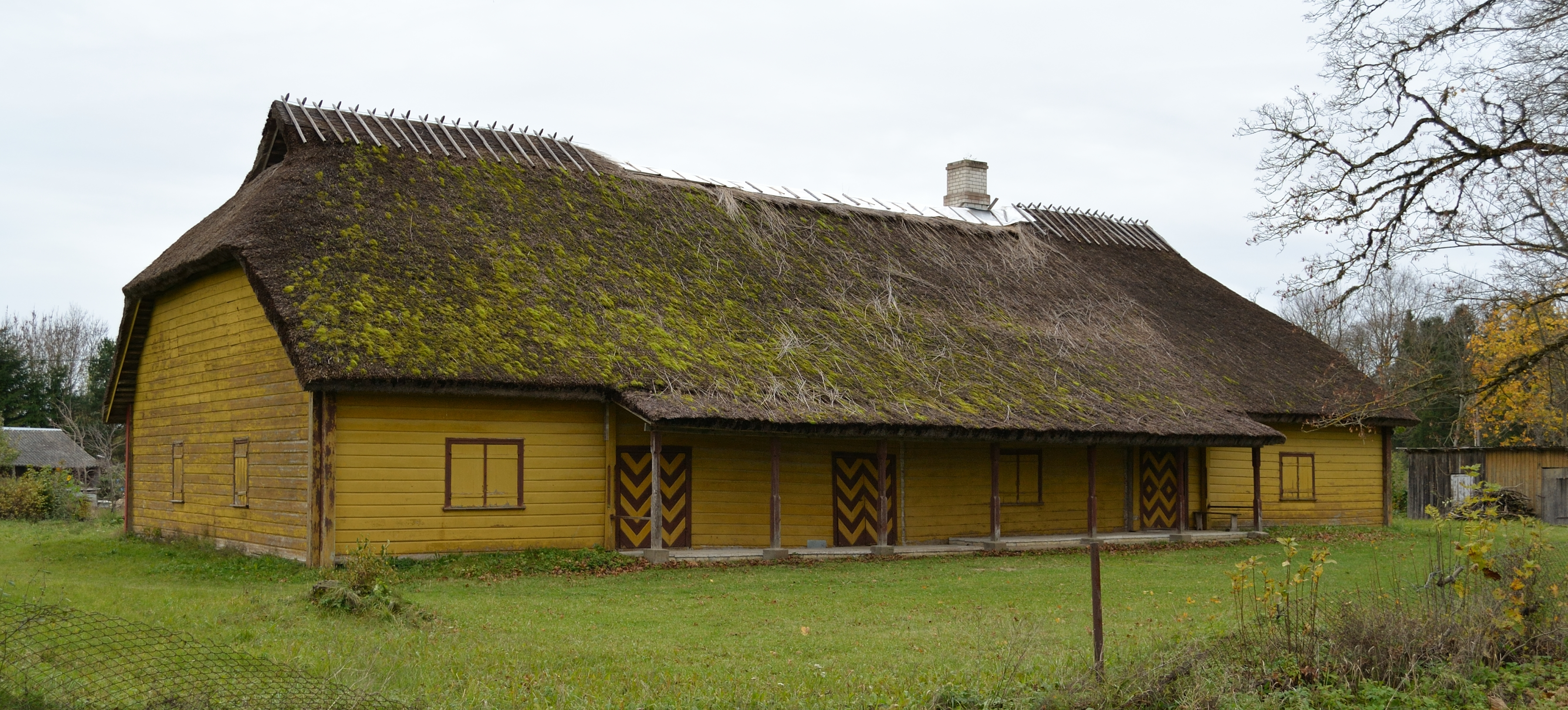
Moravian Prayer House in Hageri, a national cultural heritage monument

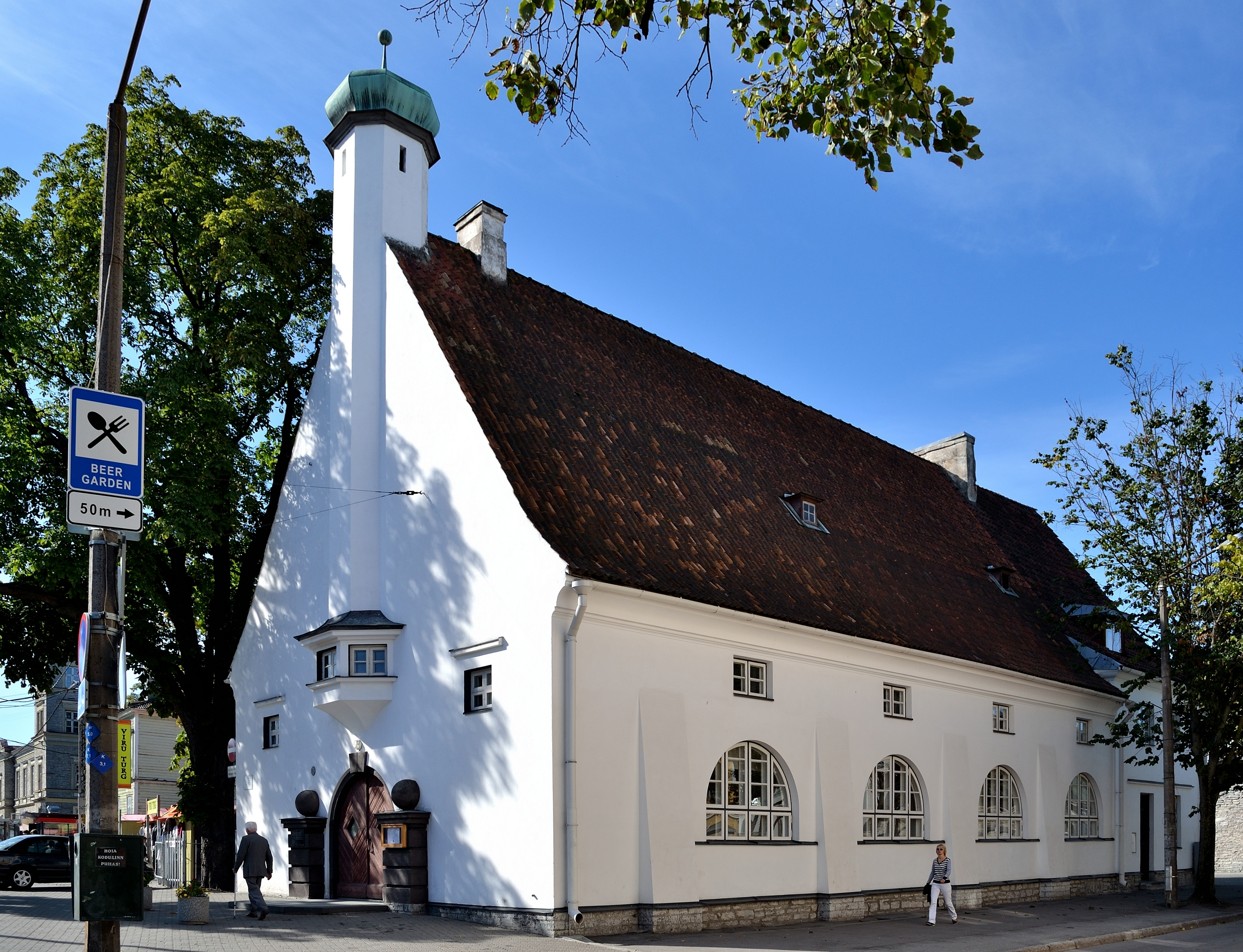
Tallinn Adventist Church

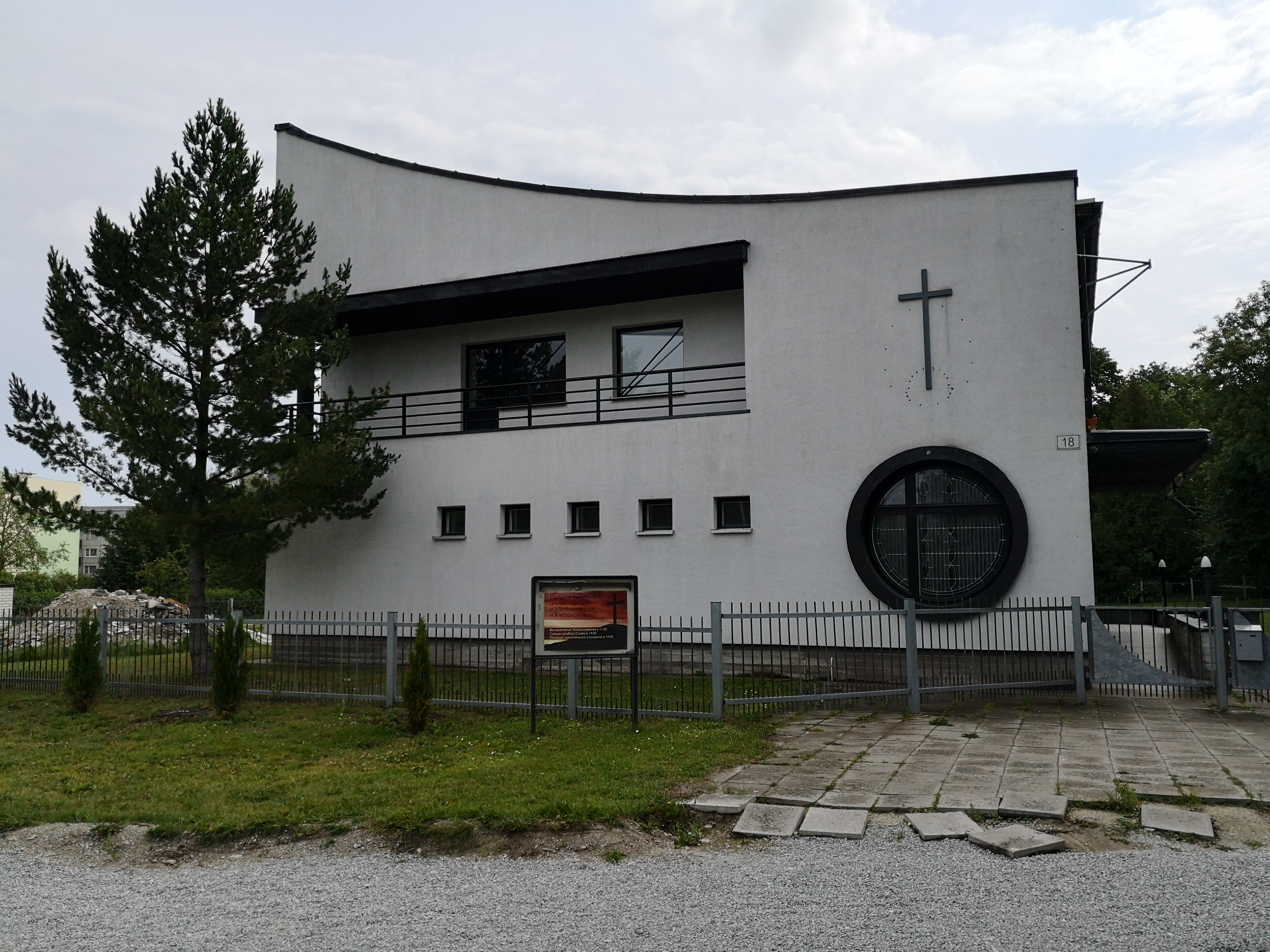
Keila New Apostolic Church

==== Methodists ====
The Methodist movement has been present in Estonia since 1907 as part of Finland and Russia missionary area of the American Methodist Episcopal Church. The first Methodist service in Estonia was held in Kuressaare, Saaremaa, in 1907. By 1 January 1940 the Methodist Church in Estonia constituted of 1,836 members in 14 congregations (Tallinn I and Tallinn II, Haapsalu, Tapa, Rakvere, Paide, Tartu, Viljandi, Pärnu, Narva, Avanduse, Kuressaare, Targu, and Paide). After the changes in the Estonian law of religion the local Methodist organization was registered in 1935 as an independent church under the name of Methodist Episcopal Church in Estonia. The Church retained its legal status as a religious organization during the Soviet years. Currently the Estonian Methodists operate as the Estonian Methodist Church.

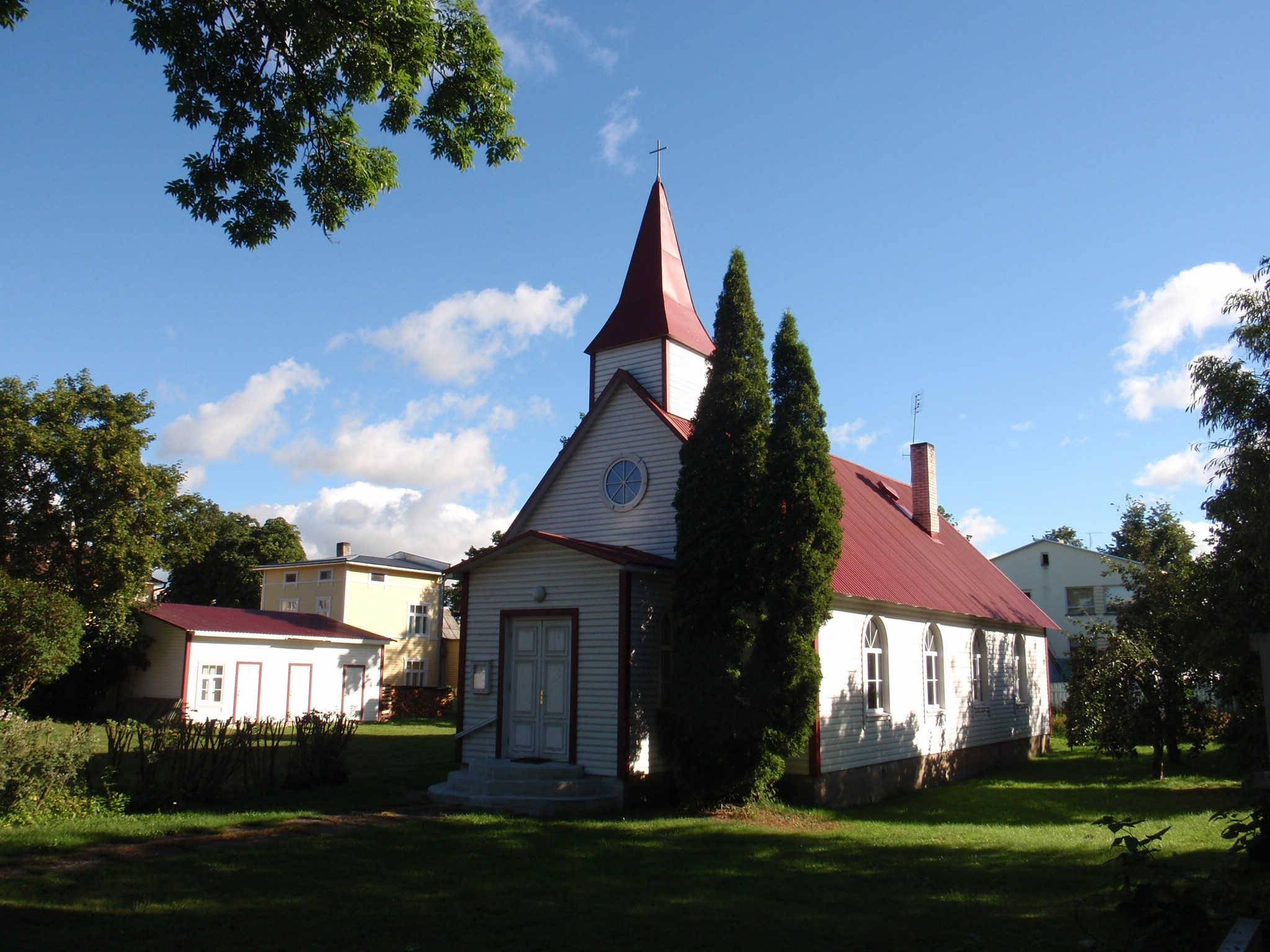
Rakvere Methodist Church

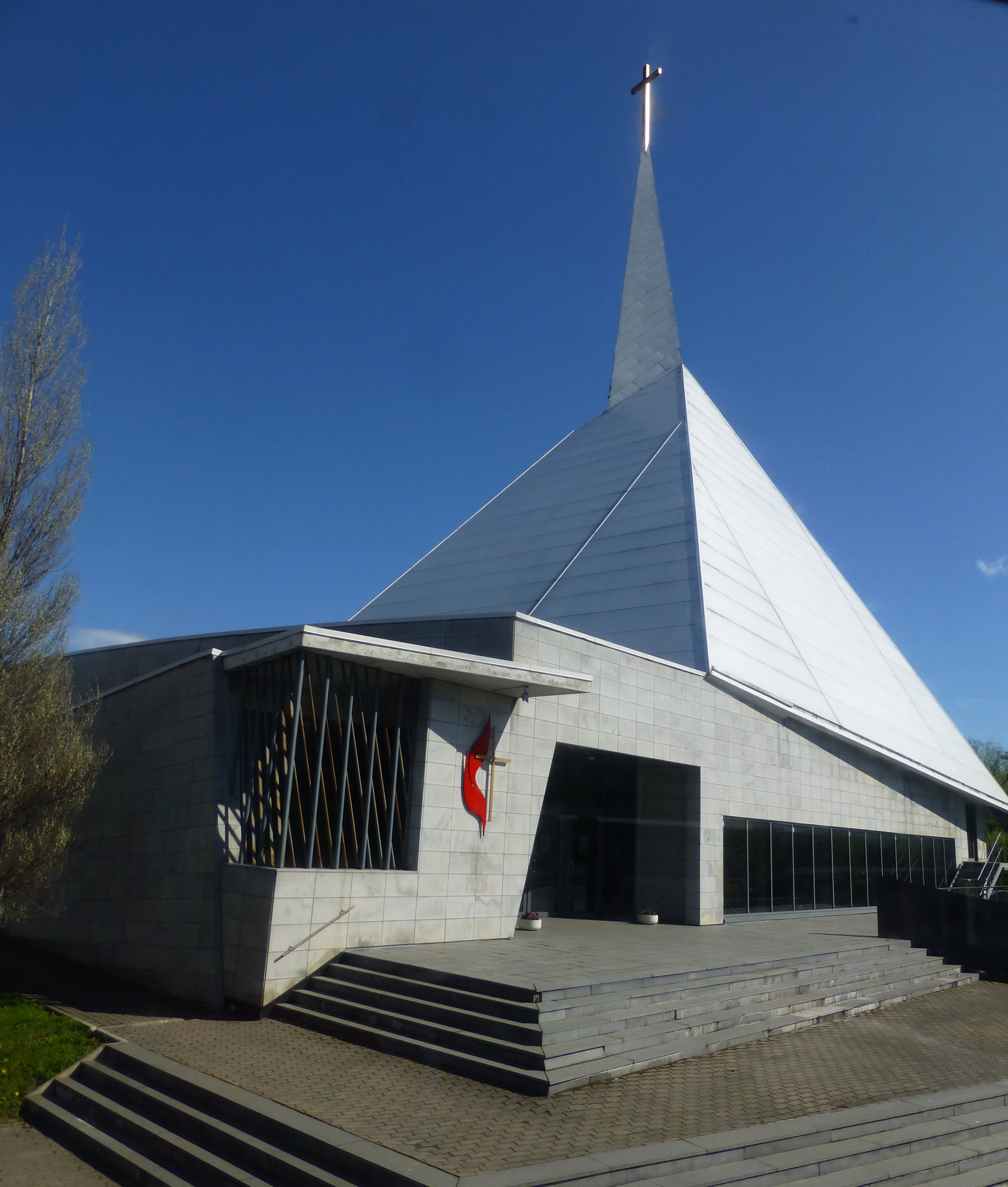
Tallinn Methodist Church

==== Pentecostals and Charismatics ====
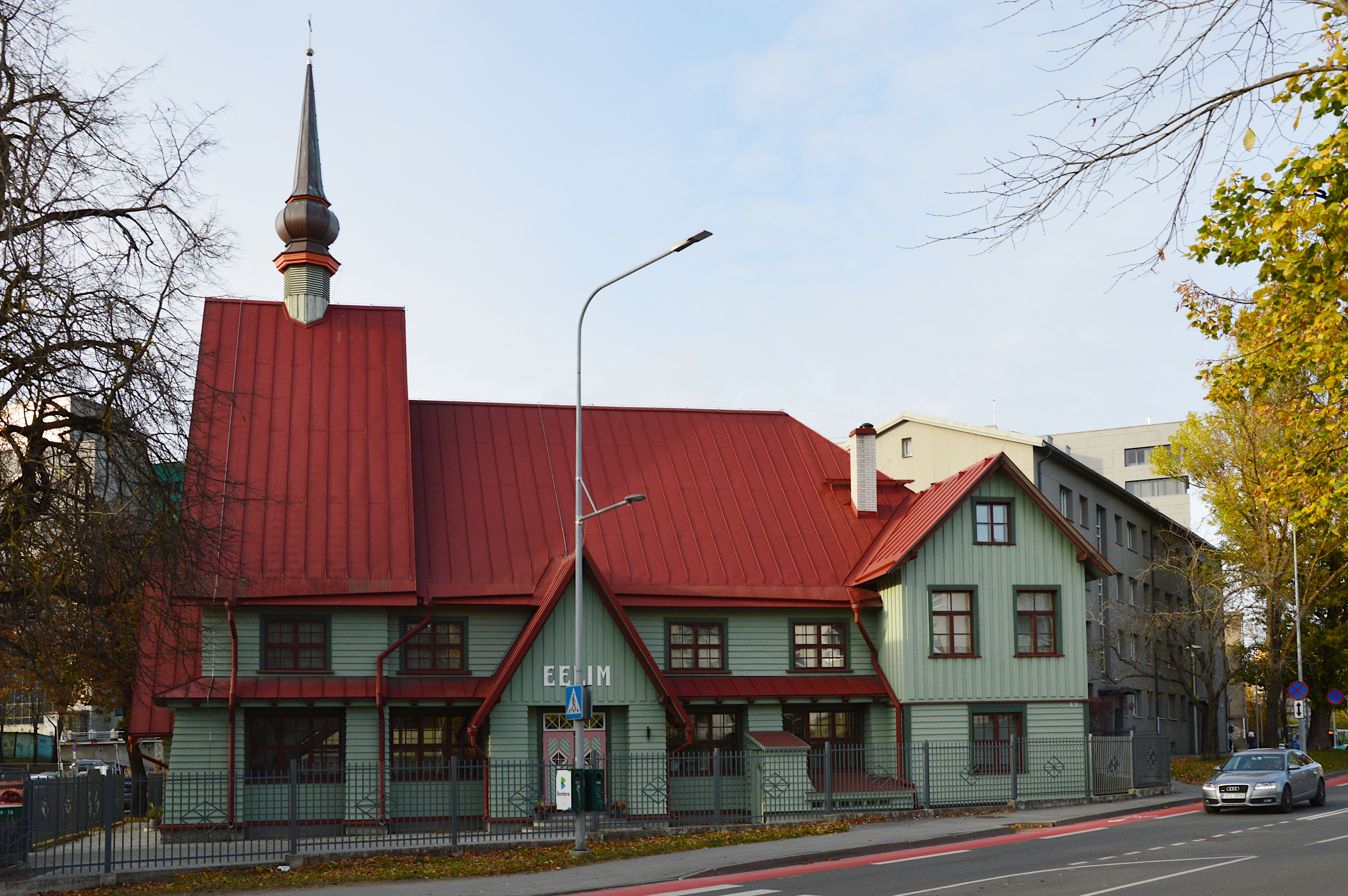
Pentecostal Congregation Elim Church in Tallinn, a national cultural heritage monument

Foreign Pentecostal missionaries from Sweden and Finland brought full fledged Pentecostalism to Estonia in the 1920s. In 1873, the Swedish Evangelical society, the Evangelical Homeland Foundation sent missionaries to Estonia at the request of the Lutheran clergy of the Coastal Swedes. These missionaries, Thure Emmanuel Thoren and Lars Osterblom started the revival among the coastal Swedes. The Revivalists broke from the Lutheran Church in 1880. The revival movement had spread to Western Estonia and they were called Ridala in 1879. The revival brought more charismatic activities such as jumping, clapping, dancing and speaking in tongues. In the later part of the 1960s, the activities of the Finnish missionaries brought charismatic Pentecostal revival in the evangelical Christian Churches and the Baptist in Tallinn. The healing ministry in the 1970s has had a great impact on the charismatic movement in the Soviet Union.

The Estonian Christian Pentecostal Church is the biggest Pentecostal Church in Estonia. It was started in 1989. There are also the Association of Estonian Evangelical Christian Pentecostal congregations, the Association of Estonian Christian Free Churches and many other independent churches. There seems to be little written history about the Pentecostal and charismatic Christianity in Estonia. Most of what is known about Pentecostal and charismatic Christianity comes from the memoirs of Evald Kiil (1997) who began his profession as a Pentecostal preacher in the 1930s. It is estimated that in the 1930s there were about 200 to 2000 Pentecostals in Estonia. The 1934 population census of Estonia indicates there were 191 people were Pentecostals, 459 were Free Gospel Churches and 306 were Revivalists. The 2011 population census of Estonia puts the total number of people belonging to Charismatic and Pentecostal Churches to about 5,256.

=== Other Christians ===
Among other Christian denominations, there is the Armenian Apostolic Church.

Denominations, whose teachings lie outside mainstream Christian traditions, Jehovah's Witnesses and Latter-day Saints or Mormons are known in Estonia.

The first Jehovah's Witnesses organizations were established in Estonia in the 1930s. In addition to Tallinn, meetings were held in Haapsalu, Tartu, Valga, Rakvere, and Narva before World War II. On June 15, 1933, the Watch Tower Bible and Tract Society was registered, and its activities were terminated on July 18, 1935. The Society was accused of distributing political propaganda, including insults to the head of state and heads of church. Jehovah's Witnesses continued their activities during and after the Soviet occupation. On October 31, 1991, the first congregation of Jehovah's Witnesses was re-registered in Tallinn. As 2017, there are 55 Jehovah's Witnesses' congregations operating, united by the Estonian Association of Jehovah's Witnesses, with approximately 15 congregation buildings or Kingdom Halls.

In 1987, a Finland Latter-day Saints Mission president had been blessed to begin work in the Baltic states and Russia, that is, during the late Soviet era. In October 1989, he sent two missionaries into Estonia. By December four Estonians had been baptized and till April 1990 one hundred people else. From Estonia it went to the neighbour countries. The LDS Church in Estonia gained formal recognition on 29 June 1990, and was reregistered in 1994.

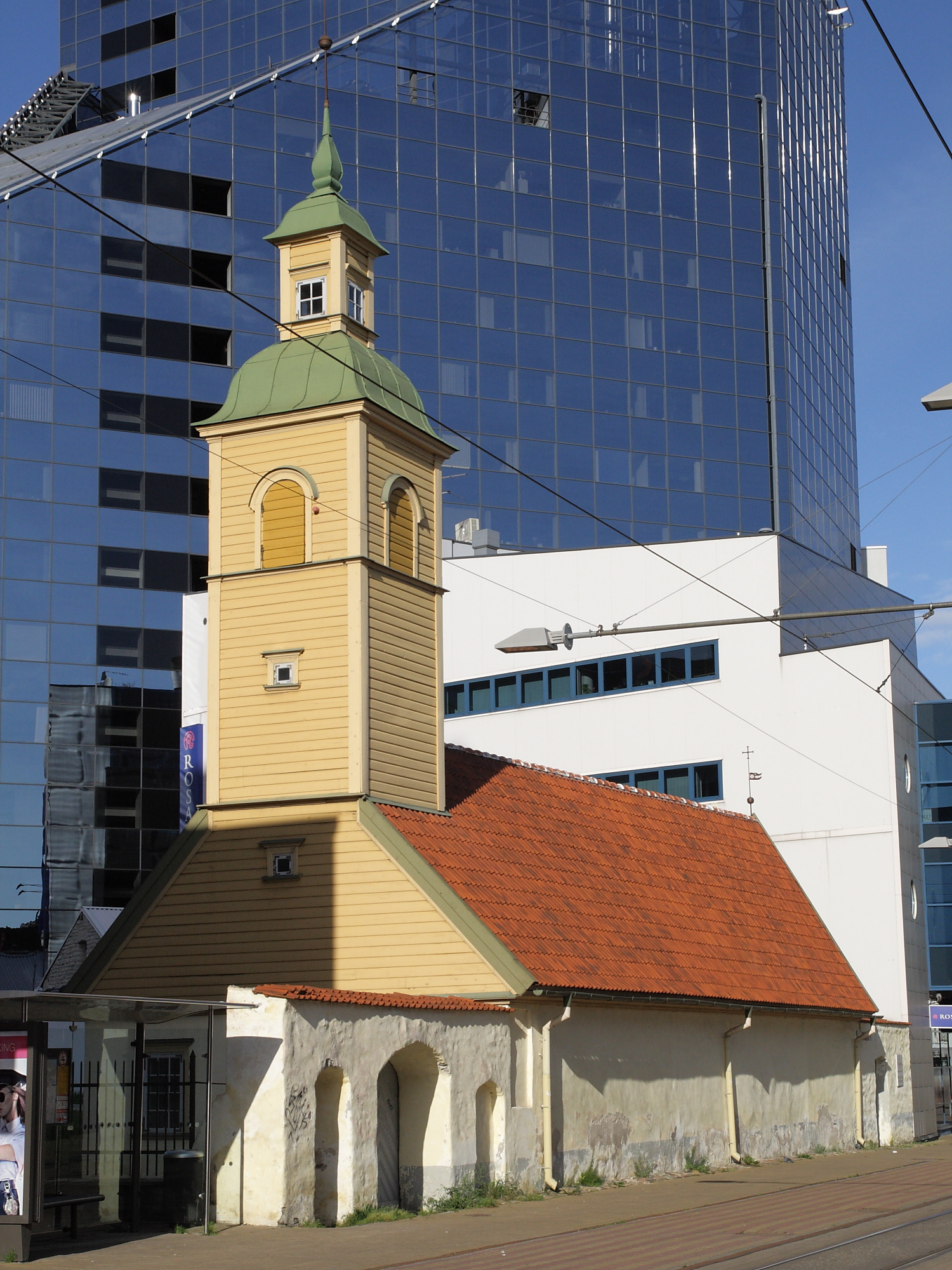
Tallinn Armenian Church of St. John's almshouse

Viljandi Jehovah's Witnesses Kingdom Hall interior

== Demographics ==
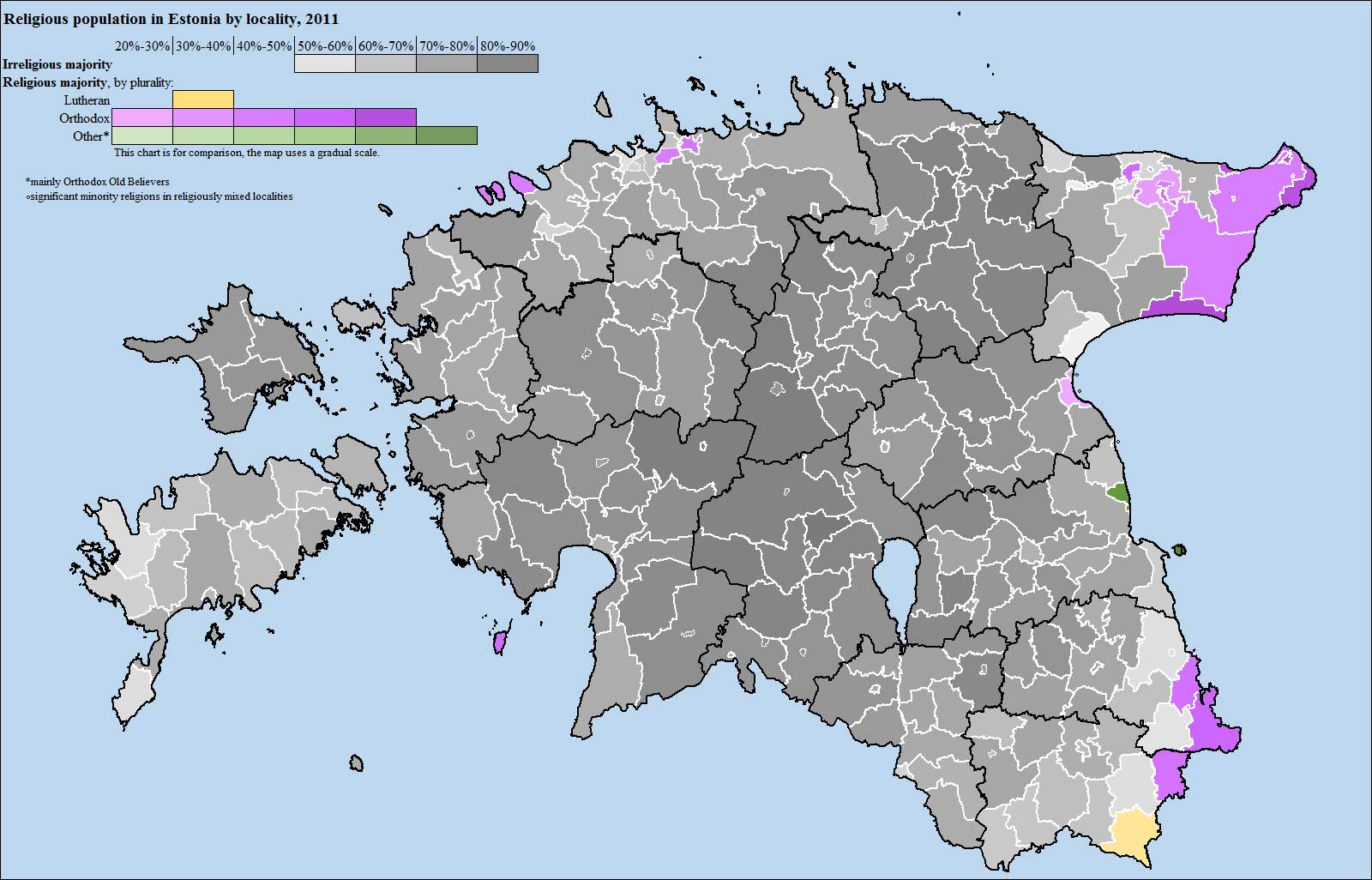
Religions in Estonia by administrative division, 2011 census.

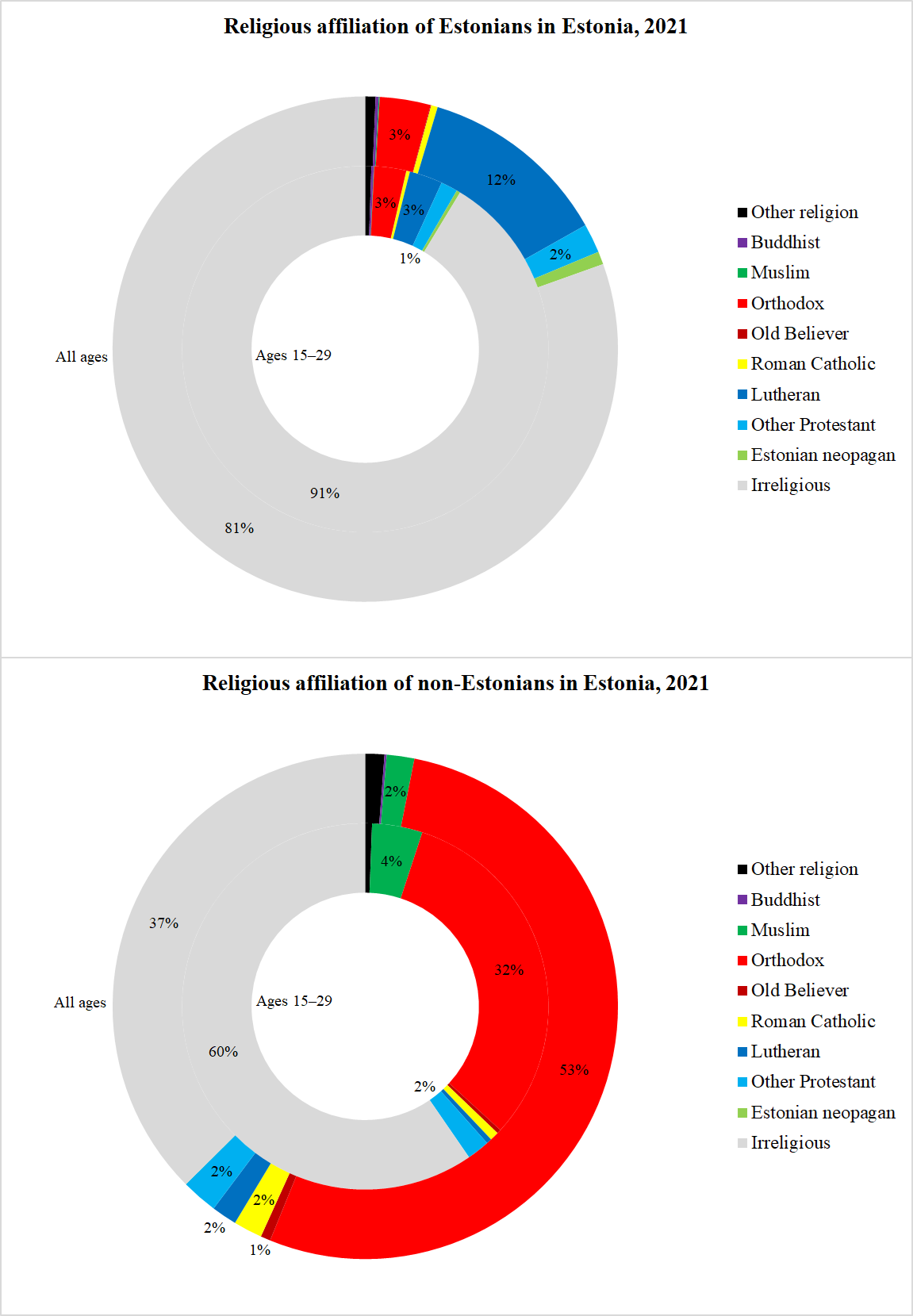
Religions among ethnic Estonians and non-Estonians, the youth and the population of all ages.

Less than a third of the population define themselves as believers; of those most are Eastern Orthodox, predominantly, but not exclusively, among the Slavic minorities, or Lutheran. There are also a number of smaller Muslim, Protestant, Jewish, and Buddhist groups. The organisation Maavalla Koda unites adherents of animist traditional religions (Estonian Neopaganism). The Russian Rodnover organisation "Vene Rahvausu Kogudus Eestis" is registered in Tartu.

=== Census statistics, 2000–2021 ===
Religious affiliations in Estonia, census 2000–2021 (Note: The censuses of Estonia count the religious affiliations of the population older than 15 years of age.)
| Religion | 2000 | | 2011 | | 2021 | |
| Religion | Number | % | Number | % | Number | % |
|---|---|---|---|---|---|---|
| Christianity | 319,770 | 28.5% | 310,481 | 28.4% | 298,410 | 26.8% |
| —Orthodox Christians | 143,554 | 12.8% | 176,773 | 16.2% | 181,770 | 16.3% |
| —Lutherans | 152,237 | 13.6% | 108,513 | 9.9% | 86,030 | 7.7% |
| —Catholics | 5,745 | 0.5% | 4,501 | 0.4% | 8,690 | 0.8% |
| —Baptists | 6,009 | 0.5% | 4,507 | 0.4% | 5,190 | 0.5% |
| —Jehovah's Witnesses | 3,823 | 0.3% | 3,938 | 0.4% | 3,720 | 0.3% |
| —Pentecostals | 2,648 | 0.2% | 1,855 | 0.2% | 2,310 | 0.2% |
| —Old Believers | 2,515 | 0.2% | 2,644 | 0.2% | 2,290 | 0.2% |
| —Methodists | 1,455 | 0.1% | 1,098 | 0.1% | 1,390 | 0.1% |
| —Adventists | 1,561 | 0.1% | 1,194 | 0.1% | 950 | 0.1% |
| —Other Christians | 223 | 0.02% | 5,458 | 0.5% | 6,070 | 0.5% |
| Islam | 1,387 | 0.1% | 1,508 | 0.1% | 5,800 | 0.5% |
| Estonian Neopaganism | 1,058 | 0.1% | 2,972 | 0.3% | 5,630 | 0.5% |
| —Native Faith (Maausk) | – | – | 1,925 | 0.2% | 3,860 | 0.3% |
| —Taaraism | – | – | 1,047 | 0.1% | 1,770 | 0.2% |
| Buddhism | 622 | 0.1% | 1,145 | 0.1% | 1,880 | 0.2% |
| Other religions (Note: Mostly other modern Paganisms, with a smaller number of other Eastern religions and Theosophical movements.) | 4,995 | 0.4% | 4,727 | 0.4% | 9,630 | 0.9% |
| No religion | 450,458 | 40.2% | 592,588 | 54.1% | 650,900 | 58.4% |
| Not stated (Note: Comprises the categories "cannot define", "refuse to answer" and "religious affiliation unknown".) | 343,292 | 30.6% | 181,104 | 16.5% | 141,780 | 12.7% |
| Total population | 1,121,582 | | 1,094,564 | | 1,114,030 | |

=== Line chart of the trends, 2000–2021 ===
Census statistics 2000–2021:

View source data.
Orthodox Christianity
Lutheranism
Other Christianity
Other religions
No religion
Not stated

==== Religions by ethnic group ====
Religious affiliation in Estonia among the major ethnic groups according to the 2021 census
| Ethnic group | Total population counted | Religious | | Lutheran | | Baptist | | Other Protestant | | Orthodox | | Old Believer | | Catholic | | Jehovah's Witness | | Estonian Neopagan | | Muslim | | Buddhist | | Other religion | | Not religious | | Refused/ unknown |
| Ethnic group | Total population counted | N | % | N | % | N | % | N | % | N | % | N | % | N | % | N | % | N | % | N | % | N | % | N | % | | | Refused/ unknown |
|---|---|---|---|---|---|---|---|---|---|---|---|---|---|---|---|---|---|---|---|---|---|---|---|---|---|---|---|---|
| Estonians | 756,180 | 130,150 | 19.54 | 80,790 | 12.13 | 4,170 | 0.63 | 6,600 | 0.99 | 21,480 | 3.22 | 300 | 0.05 | 2,780 | 0.42 | 1,620 | 0.24 | 5,460 | 0.82 | 430 | 0.06 | 1,320 | 0.20 | 4,330 | 0.65 | 536,010 | 80.46 | 90,020 |
| Russians | 269,650 | 144,910 | 63.20 | 960 | 0.42 | 530 | 0.23 | 2,490 | 1.09 | 134,460 | 58.64 | 1,910 | 0.83 | 1,280 | 0.56 | 1,320 | 0.58 | 30 | 0.01 | 100 | 0.04 | 330 | 0.14 | 940 | 0.41 | 84,380 | 36.80 | 40,360 |
| Ukrainians | 24,960 | 14,050 | 65.62 | 150 | 0.70 | 170 | 0.79 | 680 | 3.18 | 11,900 | 55.58 | — | | 280 | 1.31 | 360 | 1.68 | — | | — | | — | | 460 | 2.15 | 7,360 | 34.38 | 3,550 |
| Belarusians | 11,180 | 7,260 | 74.08 | — | | 20 | 0.20 | 20 | 0.20 | 6,440 | 65.71 | — | | 430 | 4.39 | 80 | 0.82 | — | | — | | — | | — | | 2,540 | 25.92 | 1,380 |
| Finns | 8,250 | 3,870 | 53.31 | 2,380 | 32.78 | 20 | 0.28 | 20 | 0.28 | 1,040 | 14.33 | — | | — | | 90 | 1.24 | — | | — | | — | | 40 | 0.55 | 3,390 | 46.69 | 990 |
| Latvians | 3,340 | 1,440 | 49.15 | 260 | 8.87 | 80 | 2.73 | — | | 490 | 16.72 | — | | 470 | 16.04 | — | | — | | — | | — | | — | | 1,480 | 50.51 | 410 |
| Other | 40,480 | 19,660 | 55.52 | 1,400 | 3.95 | 200 | 0.56 | 700 | 1.98 | 5,970 | 16.86 | — | | 3,320 | 9.38 | 220 | 0.62 | — | | 5,230 | 14.77 | 90 | 0.25 | 2,240 | 6.33 | 15,740 | 44.45 | 5,070 |

In census are included people aged 15 and over. The percentage is calculated from the number of respondents (excluded refused/unknown numbers).

=== Other surveys ===
- In the 1922 census, 99.3% of the Estonian population were categorized Christians.
- The Eurobarometer Poll 2010 found that 18% of the Estonian population responded that "they believe there is a God", 50% responded that "they believe there is some sort of spirit or life force" and 29% responded that "they don't believe there is any sort of spirit, God or life force". 3% gave no response. In 2015 the same survey found that 58.6% of the Estonians regarded themselves as Christians, divided between 23.2% who were Eastern Orthodox, 9.0% Protestants, 2.8% Catholics and 23.6% other Christians. The unaffiliated people made up 38.8% of the respondents and were divided between atheists who were 22.2% and agnostics who were 16.6%.
- A 2006–2008 survey held by Gallup showed that 14% of Estonians answered positively to the question: "Is religion an important part of your daily life?", which was the lowest among 143 countries polled.
- A research by Tom Esslemon in 2011 revealed that fewer than one in five Estonians say that religion plays an important role in their lives.
- A 2015 Pew Research Center survey found that 51% of the population of Estonia declared to be Christians, 45% irreligious—a category which includes atheists, agnostics and those who answered that they believed in "nothing in particular", while 2% belonged to other faiths. The Christians were divided between 25% who were Eastern Orthodox, 20% Lutherans, 5% other Christians and 1% Catholic. The irreligious people divided between 9% who were atheists, 1% who were agnostics, and 35% who answered "nothing in particular".
- The International Social Survey Programme 2015 found that 57.0% of the Estonian population declared to belong to a Christian denomination, divided between a 27.6% who were Eastern Orthodox, 26.0% Lutheran and 3.3% who belonged to smaller Christian denominations. Only 38.9% declared to have no religion.
- In 2018, according to a study jointly conducted by London's St Mary's University's Benedict XVI Centre for Religion and Society and the Institut Catholique de Paris, and based on data from the European Social Survey 2014–2016, among the 16 to 29 years-old Estonians 19% were Christians (13% Orthodox, 3% Protestant, 1% Catholic and 1% other Christian denominations) and 80% were not religious.

== See also ==
- Buddhism in Estonia
- Catholic Church in Estonia
- Eastern Orthodoxy in Estonia
- Estonian Methodist Church
- Hinduism in Estonia
- History of the Jews in Estonia
- Irreligion in Estonia
- Islam in Estonia
- List of cathedrals in Estonia
- List of churches in Estonia
- List of religious organizations based in Estonia
