= The Lord's Transfiguration Orthodox Church, Pärnu =

Church building in Pärnu, Estonia

The Lord's Transfiguration Orthodox Church
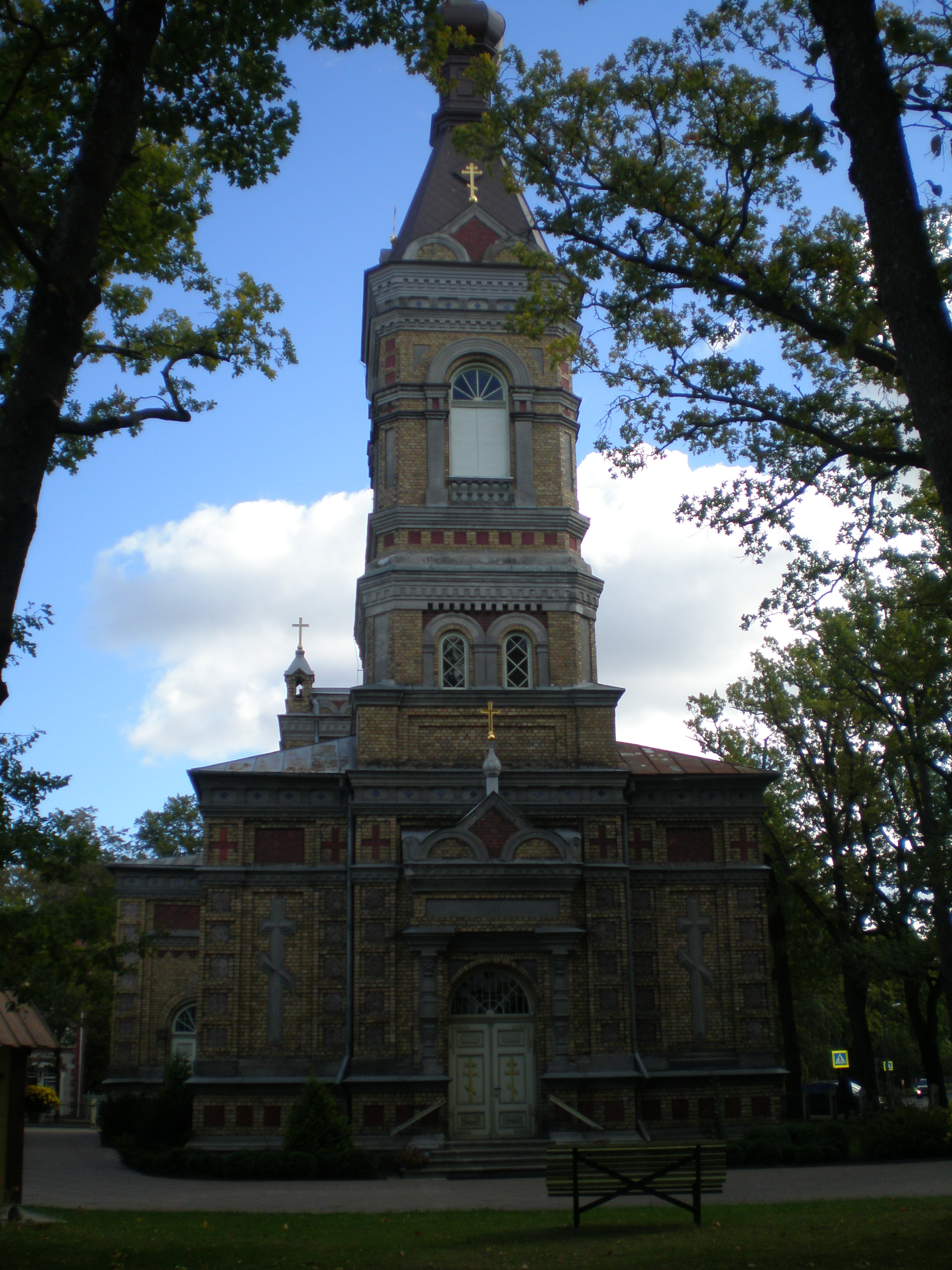
- The Lord's Transfiguration Orthodox Church, Pärnu
- The Lord's Transfiguration Orthodox Church
- 58°23′02″N 24°30′22″E
- Location: Pärnu
- Country: Estonia
- Denomination: Eastern Orthodox Church

History
- Consecrated: 1904

The Lord's Transfiguration Orthodox Church (Estonian: Pärnu Issandamuutmise kirik) is an Orthodox church in Pärnu, Estonia. The church belongs to Estonian Apostolic Orthodox Church.

The church was built in 1902–1904. The church was designed by Vladimir Lunski and Karl Klein. In 1904, the church was inaugurated. The building's height is 38 m.

In 1910, the church's congregation had 5757 members; in 1939, 3006 members.
