= Eastern Orthodoxy in Estonia =

Eastern Orthodoxy in Estonia is practiced by 16.5% of the population as of 2011, making it the most identified religion and Christian denomination in this majority-secular state after surpassing Lutheran Christianity with 9.1% (which was previously 13.6% in 2000 census) for the first time in the country's modern history. Eastern Orthodox Christianity is mostly practiced within Estonia's Russian ethnic minority, with a smaller number of the ethnically Estonian population. According to the 2000 Estonian census, 72.9% of those who identified as Orthodox Christians were of Russian descent.

Today, there are two branches of the Eastern Orthodox Church operating in Estonia: the Estonian Apostolic Orthodox Church, an autonomous church under the Ecumenical Patriarchate of Constantinople, and the Estonian Orthodox Church of the Moscow Patriarchate, a semi-autonomous church of the Russian Orthodox Church.

== History ==
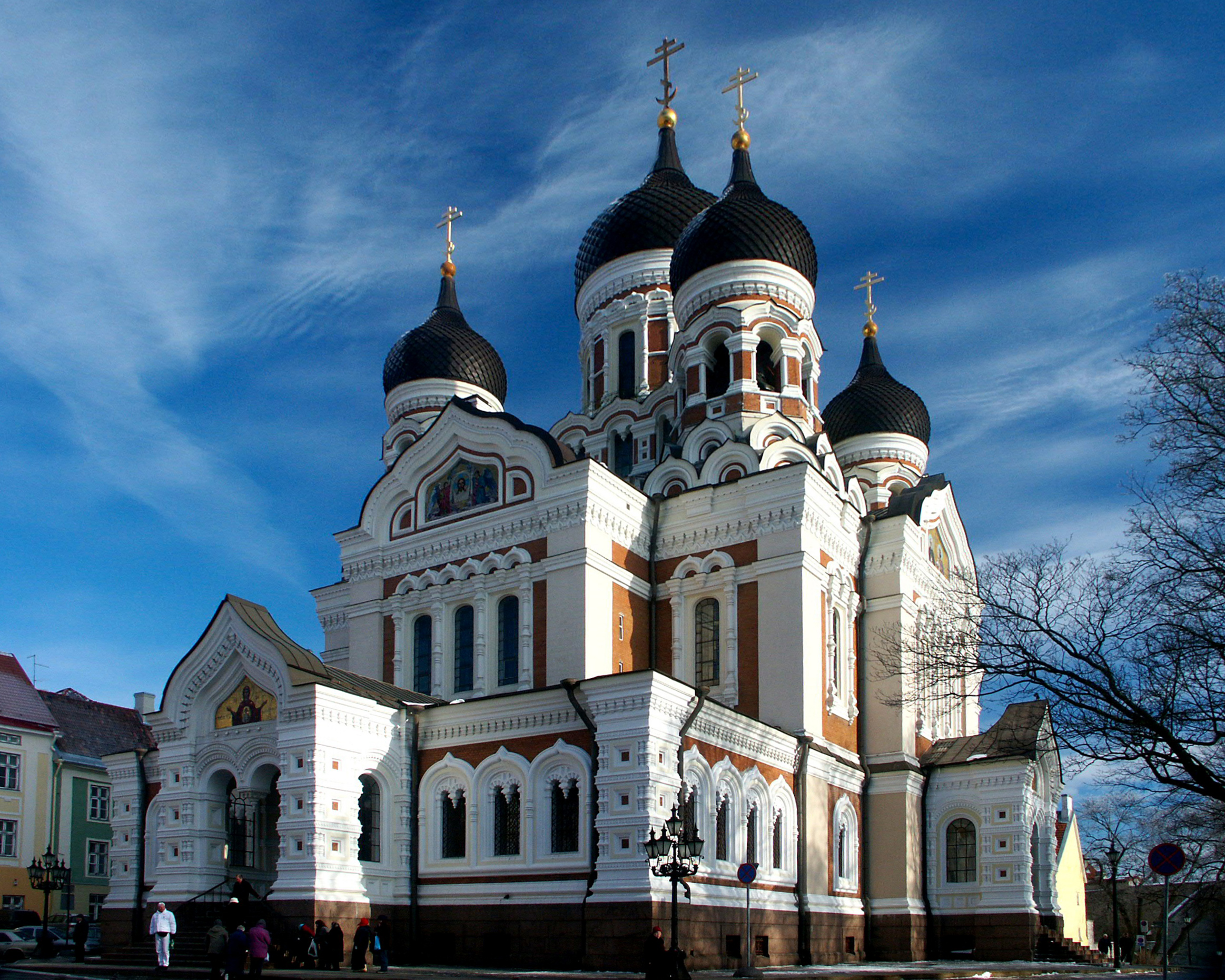
Alexander Nevsky Cathedral in Tallinn, built at the end of the 19th century.

Orthodoxy was most likely first introduced in the 10th through 12th centuries by missionaries from Novgorod and Pskov active among the Estonians in the southeast regions of the area close to Pskov. The first mention of an Orthodox congregation in Estonia dates from 1030. Around 600 AD on the east side of Toome Hill (Toomemägi) the Estonians established the town Tarbatu (modern Tartu). In 1030, the Kievan prince, Yaroslav the Wise, raided Tarbatu and built his own fort called Yuryev, as well as, allegedly, a congregation in a cathedral dedicated to his patron saint, St. George. The congregation may have survived until 1061, when, according to chronicles, Yuryev was burned to the ground and the Orthodox Christians expelled.

As a result of the Baltic Crusades in the beginning of the 13th century, northern Estonia was conquered by Denmark and the southern part of the country by the Teutonic Order and later by the Livonian Brothers of the Sword, and thus all of present-day Estonia fell under the control of Western Christianity. However, Russian merchants from Novgorod and Pskov were later able to set up small Orthodox congregations in several Estonian towns. One such congregation was expelled from the town of Dorpat (Tartu) by the Germans in 1472, who martyred their priest, Isidor, along with a number of Orthodox faithful (the group is commemorated on January 8).

Little is known about the history of the church in the area until the 17th and 18th centuries, when many Old Believers fled there from Russia to avoid the liturgical reforms introduced by Patriarch Nikon of the Russian Orthodox Church.

In the 18th and 19th centuries, Estonia was part of the Imperial Russian Empire, having been ceded by the Swedish Empire in 1721 following its defeat in the Great Northern War. During the 1800s, a significant number of Estonian peasants converted to the emperor's Orthodox faith in the (unfulfilled) hope of being rewarded with land. This led to the establishment of the diocese of Riga (in modern Latvia) by the Russian Orthodox Church in 1850. In the late 19th century, a wave of Russification was introduced, supported by the Russian hierarchy but not by the local Estonian clergy. The Cathedral of St. Alexander Nevsky in Tallinn and the Pühtitsa Convent in Kuremäe were built around this time.

=== The road to autonomy ===
As Estonian nationalism grew steadily through the 19th century, the Estonian clergy also aspired for greater independence, starting with an Estonian diocese having a see in Tallinn headed by an Estonian bishop. In 1917 a plenary council chose Paul Kulbusch, a priest of the St. Petersburg Estonian Orthodox community, to become Bishop Platon of Tallinn. A staunch advocate of independence, he was executed two years later by the Red Army during the Estonian War of Independence.

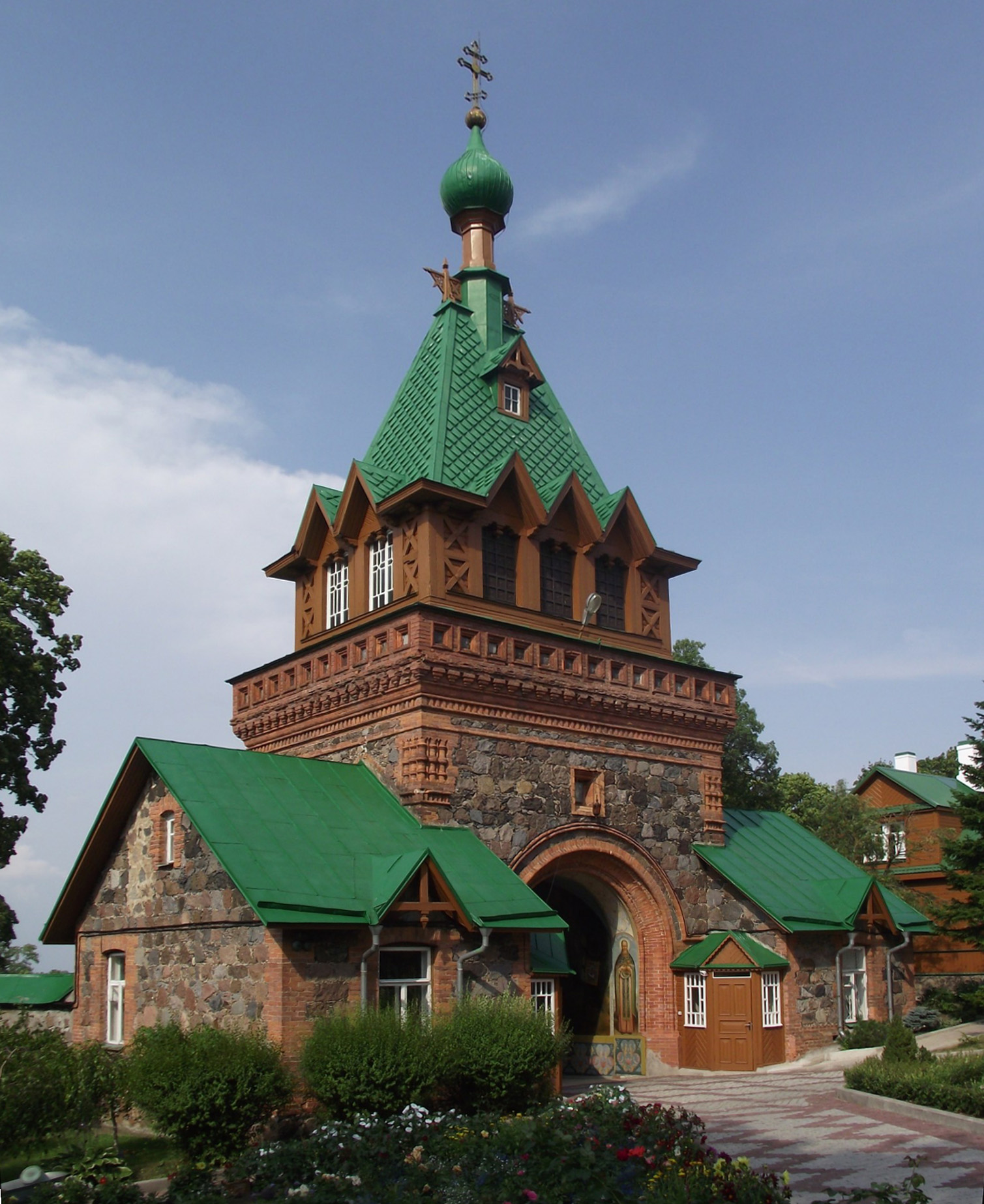
Pühtitsa Convent in Kuremäe, eastern Estonia.

Following the Russian recognition of an independent Estonian state, the Patriarch of the Russian Orthodox Church, St. Tikhon, in 1920 recognized the Estonian Apostolic Orthodox Church (EAOC) as autonomous in economic, administrative and educational concerns, and granted it temporary autocephaly. Archbishop Aleksander Paulus was elected and ordained Metropolitan of Tallinn and All Estonia, head of the EAOC.

Prior to this, Soviet Russia had adopted a Marxist–Leninist ideology which held as an ideological goal the elimination of religion and its replacement with state atheism. In response, Patriarch Tikhon had excommunicated the Soviet leadership in 1918, leading to a period of intense persecution of the Russian Orthodox Church. In April 1922, Tikhon was imprisoned, and the Estonian clergy lost contact with the Moscow Patriarchate. In September 1922 the Council of the Estonian Apostolic Orthodox Church petitioned the Patriarch of Constantinople, Meletius IV, to (1) transfer control of the Estonian church from the Russian Orthodox Church to the Patriarchate of Constantinople, and (2) clarify the Estonian church's canonical status. In 1923 the Patriarchate of Constantinople issued a tomos (ecclesiastical edict) which brought the EAOC under Constantinople's jurisdiction and granted it autonomy, but not full autocephaly.

In 1935 the church legally registered its statute with the state under the name Estonian Apostolic Orthodox Church. This would have important legal ramifications later.

The Estonian church remained a subject of the Constantinople Patriarchate until World War II. By that time, roughly one fifth of the total Estonian population were Orthodox Christians, including Konstantin Päts, Estonia's first President. There were over 210,000 adherents (mostly ethnic Estonians), three bishops, 156 parishes, 131 priests, 19 deacons, and a Chair of Orthodoxy in the Faculty of Theology at the University of Tartu. Notable Orthodox institutions included the Pskovo-Pechersky Monastery in Petseri, two convents—in Narva and Kuremäe, a priory in Tallinn and a seminary in Petseri.

=== Soviet occupation ===
In 1940, Estonia became a constituent republic of the Soviet Union, as part of a secret territory-dividing agreement in the German–Soviet Nonaggression Pact of August 1939. During the Soviet era, the Estonian church's decision to break with Moscow in favor of Constantinople was ruled illegal. Consequently, the church lost its autonomy and was merged into the Russian Orthodox Church on 28 February 1941. More than half of the Estonian Orthodox clergy resigned in protest.

This arrangement proved to be short-lived, as Nazi Germany invaded Estonia in July 1941. This triggered the first schism in the history of Estonian Orthodoxy; in 1942 the church declared its autonomy and renewed relations with the Constantinople Patriarchate, but the Estonian diocese of Narva, mostly populated by ethnic Russians, maintained its connection to the Russian Orthodox Church.

In time, Germany's fortunes changed. By early 1944, Russia's Red Army had pushed the invading German troops back to the Estonian border. With Soviet reoccupation imminent, an estimated 100,000 people fled Estonia. Among these were Metropolitan Alexander, who along with roughly 20 priests established the Estonian Apostolic Orthodox Church in Exile at Stockholm. There, the EAOC in Exile served about 10,000 Estonian Orthodox Christians worldwide.

Despite stiff resistance from retreating German troops and Estonian nationalists, the Soviet Union reasserted control over Estonia by autumn of 1944. In 1945, the Moscow Patriarchate liquidated the EAOC, dismissing the remaining clergy and bringing all Estonian congregations into a single diocese within the Russian Orthodox Church.

The Estonian Orthodox church remained split as long as Estonia was a member state of the Soviet Union, nearly half a century. Before his death in 1953, Metropolitan Alexander established his congregation as an exarchate under Constantinople. A synod was organized in Sweden in 1958 to maintain the continuity of the church in exile. Within Estonia, the church continued as a diocese of the Russian Orthodox Church. In 1978, at the request of the Russian Orthodox Church, the Ecumenical Patriarchate of Constantinople ruled the 1923 autonomy-granting tomos "inoperable", meaning Constantinople acknowledged the impossibility of an autonomous Orthodox church operating within the Estonian Soviet Socialist Republic.

=== Estonian independence and property reform ===
On 20 August 1991, Estonia proclaimed its independence from a disintegrating Soviet Union, restoring the pre-1940 parliamentary government. Divisions within the Orthodox community soon arose; some wanted to remain under the Moscow Patriarchate, while others wished to reinstate the autonomous church under the jurisdiction of the Patriarchate of Constantinople.

There was a legal aspect to the question as well. Once independent, Estonia began a program of property reform—that is, restoring property expropriated by the Soviets during the occupation. But the question of which church—the one in exile under Constantinople, or the one in Estonia, under Moscow—was the rightful Estonian Orthodox Church was unanswered.

Early in 1993, the Estonian parliament passed the Churches and Congregations Act, which required all religious institutions to re-register with the Ministry of Internal Affairs. In August of the same year, the church in exile registered the 1935 statute, meaning it considered itself the continuation of the original Estonian Apostolic Orthodox Church. In November, the Moscow-led diocese attempted to register the same 1935 statute, but was refused. In response, the diocese sued, attempting to establish that it, and not the church in exile, had maintained continuity of the Estonian Apostolic Orthodox Church during Soviet occupation. The court rebuffed this effort, ruling that the church in exile was indeed the legitimate successor of the Orthodox church in post-Soviet Estonia, making the EAOC the sole legal heir of all pre-1940 Orthodox church properties in Estonia.

The Moscow Patriarchate strongly opposed this ruling. Of particular concern were about 20 churches built before the 1940s, and therefore legally the property of the EAOC, run by the Moscow-led diocese. In February 1996, the Constantinople Patriarchate reinstated the 1923 tomos that granted the Estonian Apostolic Orthodox Church's autonomy and established canonical subordination to the Ecumenical Patriarchate, stating that while the tomos had been declared inoperable in 1978, it "was not regarded as being void, invalid or revoked". The Moscow Patriarchate, whose Estonian-born Patriarch Alexei II regarded his native Estonia as part of his canonical territory, abruptly severed relations with Constantinople, including a break of communion between the churches.

Relations between the conflicting Patriarchates were restored three months later, after meetings in Zurich reached the following agreement: both the autonomous church and the Russian diocese could operate in parallel within Estonia, and individual parishes and clergy would be allowed to choose which jurisdiction to follow. A referendum was held, and a majority of parishes (54 of 84, generally along ethnic lines) chose the autonomous Estonian Apostolic Orthodox Church, even though a majority of the parishioners supported the Moscow Patriarchate.

The Russian diocese continued its campaign to claim legal succession until 2001, when it dropped attempts to register the 1935 statute, and instead applied to the Ministry of Internal Affairs with the name "Estonian Orthodox Church of Moscow Patriarchate". The EAOC protested, saying it was too similar to "Estonian Apostolic Orthodox Church". At first, the government sided with the EAOC, who suggested instead names such as the "Russian Orthodox Church in Estonia" or the "Russian Orthodox Church diocese". The Estonian Business Association soon lobbied on behalf of the Moscow Patriarchate, because statements by Russian officials led them to believe a favorable registration would lead to reduced customs tariffs on Estonian-Russian trade. The effort succeeded, and on 17 April 2002 the Russian diocese was registered as the Estonian Orthodox Church of Moscow Patriarchate (EOCMP). This did not bring about any of the hoped-for tariff reductions, though.

=== The church today ===
The Orthodox community in Estonia, which accounts for about 16.5% of the total population as of 2011 and which has become the largest Christian denomination in the country over Lutheranism for the first time in country's modern history, remains divided, with the majority of faithful (mostly ethnic Russians) remaining under Moscow. As of a government report in 2004, about 20,000 believers (mostly ethnic Estonians) in 54 parishes are part of the Estonian Apostolic Orthodox autonomous church under Constantinople, while 150,000 faithful in 30 parishes, along with the monastic community of Pühtitsa, are with the Moscow Patriarchate.

The issues around property ownership have been mostly settled. In 2002, the EAOC agreed to transfer ownership of churches used by the EOCMP to the state, who in turn would issue 50-year leases on the properties to the EOCMP. In return, the state agreed to renovate EAOC churches.

== See also ==
- Estonian Apostolic Orthodox Church
- Estonian Orthodox Church of Moscow Patriarchate
- Religion in Estonia
- Catholic Church in Estonia
