= List of religious organizations based in Estonia =

This is the list of religious organizations based in Estonia. The list is incomplete.

== Christian organizations ==
- Estonian Apostolic Orthodox Church
- Estonian Evangelical Lutheran Church
- Estonian Methodist Church
- Estonian Orthodox Church of the Moscow Patriarchate
- Union of Free Evangelical and Baptist Churches of Estonia

== Buddhist organizations ==
- Budakoda MTÜ.
- Estonian Theravada Sangha Monastery

== Muslim organization ==
- Estonian Islamic Congregation

== Native religion organizations ==
- Maavalla Koda
  - Emujärve Koda
  - Härjapea Koda
  - Emajõe Koda
  - Maausuliste Saarepealne Koda
