= Stephanos of Tallinn =

Eastern Orthodox metropolitan, working in Estonia

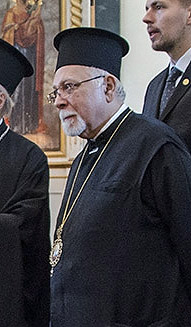
Stephanos of Tallinn

Metropolitan Stephanos of Tallinn and All Estonia (Estonian: Stefanus; born 29 April 1940) is the primate (elected in 1999) of the Estonian Apostolic Orthodox Church.

== Life ==
Stephanos was born Christakis Charalambides in Bukavu, Belgian Congo (now Democratic Republic of the Congo). His parents were of Greek Cypriot ancestry.

He undertook a year of study towards a medical degree at the Catholic University of Leuven in Belgium, and in 1960 switched to divinity studies. He transferred to the St. Sergius Orthodox Theological Institute in Paris, simultaneously pursuing studies at the University of Paris. He received the degree of Master of Theology from St. Sergius and the degree of lector from the university.

Charalambides was ordained to the diaconate on 6 January 1963 and to the priesthood on 17 November 1968 for service in the Greek Orthodox Metropolis of France. He was appointed in 1972 as protosyngellos (episcopal vicar) for the southern region of France, with his base in Nice. Stephanos was consecrated on 25 March 1987 to the episcopacy with the titular title of Bishop of Nazianzus. While continuing his previous responsibilities, he also became secretary of the Assembly of Orthodox Bishops of France, lector at St. Sergius, and professor of patrology at the Roman Catholic seminary of Nice.

In 1996, the Ecumenical Patriarchate restored the Estonian Orthodox Church as an autonomous entity under its protection, following the restoration of independence of Estonia from the Soviet Union. A General Assembly of the church elected Stephanos as Metropolitan of Tallinn and All Estonia. He was installed on 21 March 1999.

== Honours ==
- Legion of Honour, Officer (2003)
- Order of the White Star, 2nd Class (2007)

== See also ==
- Orthodox Church of Estonia
