= Irreligion in Estonia =

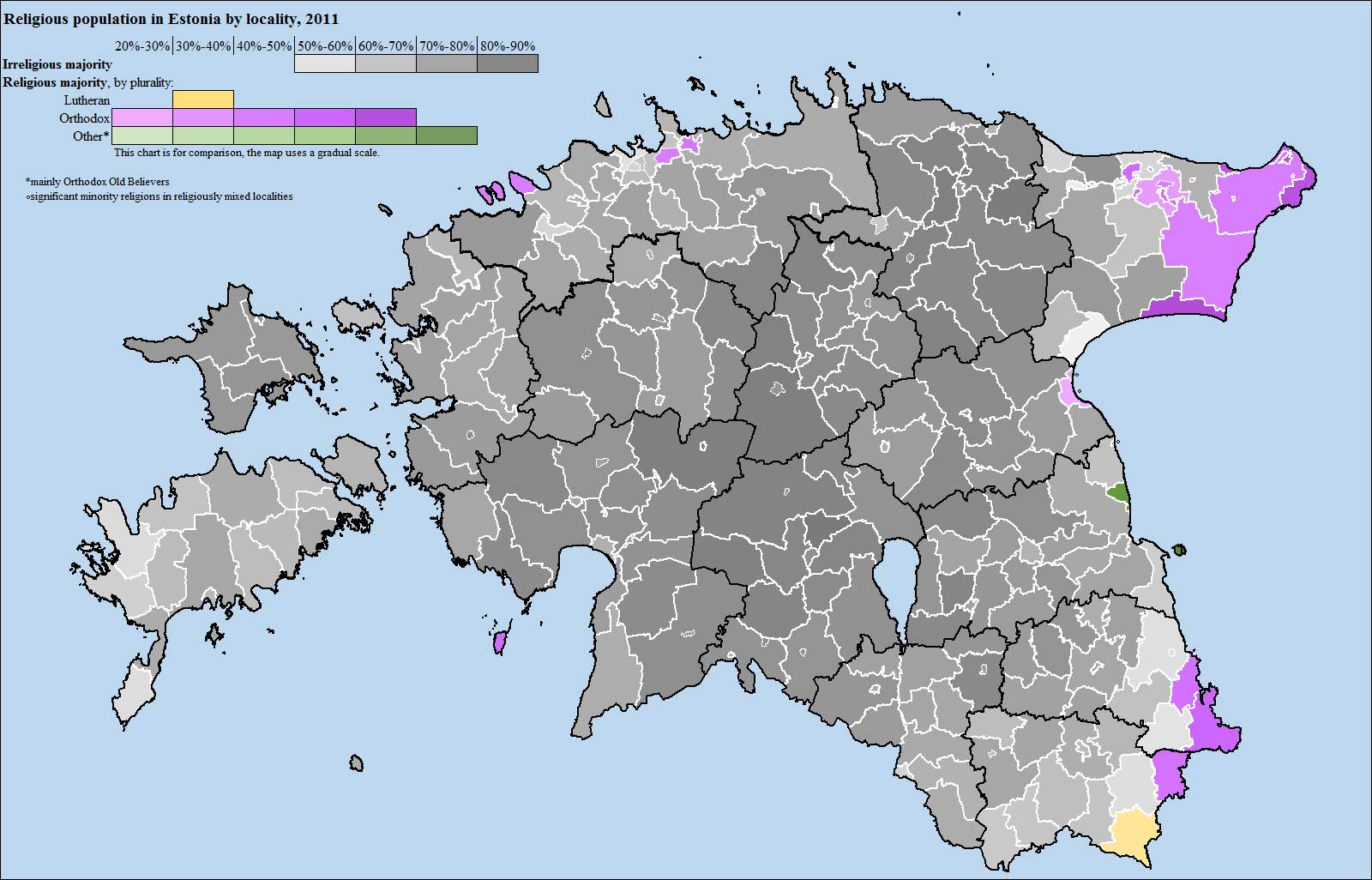
Religion in Estonia, 2011. Irreligious communities are denoted in grey.

Religion in Estonia (2011)
1. Unaffiliated (64.9%)
2. Eastern Orthodox (19.9%)
3. Lutheran (12.0%)
4. Other Protestant (1.20%)
5. Other Christian (0.93%)
6. Other religions (1.10%)

Irreligion in Estonia pertains to atheism, agnosticism, and secularism of the people and institutions of Estonia. Irreligion is prominent in Estonia, where a majority of citizens are unaffiliated with any religion. Estonian irreligion dates back to the 19th century, when Estonian nationalists and intellectuals deemed Christianity a foreign religion in opposition to Estonian independence. Irreligion in Estonia was later accelerated by the Soviet occupation of the Baltic states, in which state atheism was enforced. By some metrics, Estonia is the most irreligious country in the world.

== History ==
Modern irreligion in Estonia began during the Estonian national awakening in the 19th century, amid a period of anti-German sentiment. Lutheranism was the dominant religion in Estonia at the time, and Estonian intellectuals began to reject the religion due to its German associations. Anti-clericalism, freethought, socialism, Darwinism, and nationalism all contributed to atheist thought during this time. Journalists such as Juhan Lilienbach and Ado Grenzstein played a major role in spreading these ideas to the public.

As Estonia achieved independence in 1918, irreligion became relevant in the Estonian national identity. Separation of church and state was implemented, and the practice of religious education became the subject of debate. During the 1920s, marriage was secularized and placed under government control. Atheist thought was co-opted by Communist movements during the 1920s and 1930s in order to advance the cause of Marxism–Leninism. This association with Communism led to renewed distrust of irreligion as memories of the Red Terror's influence in Estonia still lingered. Following the Soviet occupation of Estonia, religion was largely eradicated from public life. State atheism was enforced, but it was of relatively low priority for the Communist government in Estonia, and religion was not a major issue during Soviet occupation. In contrast to Soviet atheism, anti-Communist atheists were also active at the time.

Since achieving independence from the Soviet Union, religion has not been prominent in Estonian life, and irreligion in Estonia has become passive in nature. However, religious education in Estonia continues to be a subject of debate. Courses on religion are currently optional in Estonian schools, and proponents of secularism oppose expanding religious education in fear that it would be dominated by Christian teachings.

== Demographics ==
Due to the low prevalence of religion, irreligion in Estonia is typically marked by indifference toward religion rather than opposition to it. Most Estonians have little experience with formal religion or religious ideas, and as a result, irreligious Estonians don't consider irreligion to be part of their identity. In 2008, Gallup found that only 14% of Estonians consider religion to be an important part of their life, lower than any other country they surveyed.

In the 2000 census, 40.16% of Estonians identified as irreligious. In the 2011 census, 54.14% of Estonians identified as irreligious. Irreligion is more common among ethnic Estonians, where irreligion was found to be as high as 65.47% in 2011. Despite the limited presence of religion and the church in Estonian society, spirituality is still prevalent. New Age ideas and belief in the supernatural maintain a significant presence in Estonia. In the 2021 census, 58% of Estonians had no religion.

== See also ==
- Demographics of Estonia
- Religion in Estonia
- Taaraism
