= Aleksander Paulus =

Estonian clergyman

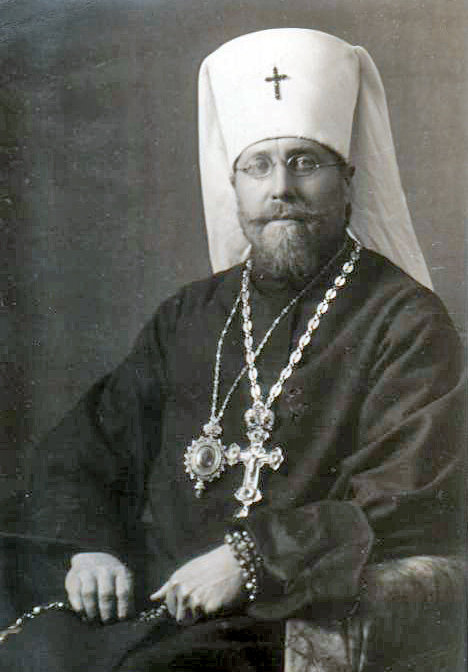
Aleksander Paulus

Metropolitan Alexander (secular name Aleksander Paulus, Russian: Александр Карлович Паулус; 15 February 1872 Uue-Vändra Parish (now Põhja-Pärnumaa Parish), Kreis Pernau – 18 October 1953 Stockholm) was an Estonian Orthodox clergyman.

Paulus was the primate of the Estonian Apostolic Orthodox Church. From 1920 until 1923, he was the Archbishop of Tallinn and Estonia. From 1923, he was Metropolitan of Tallinn and the whole of Estonia.

He was a member of IV Riigikogu, representing the Estonian People's Party.
