= Tallinn Cathedral of the Transfiguration of Our Lord =

Church building in Tallinn, Estonia

Coordinates: 59°26′23″N 24°44′37″E

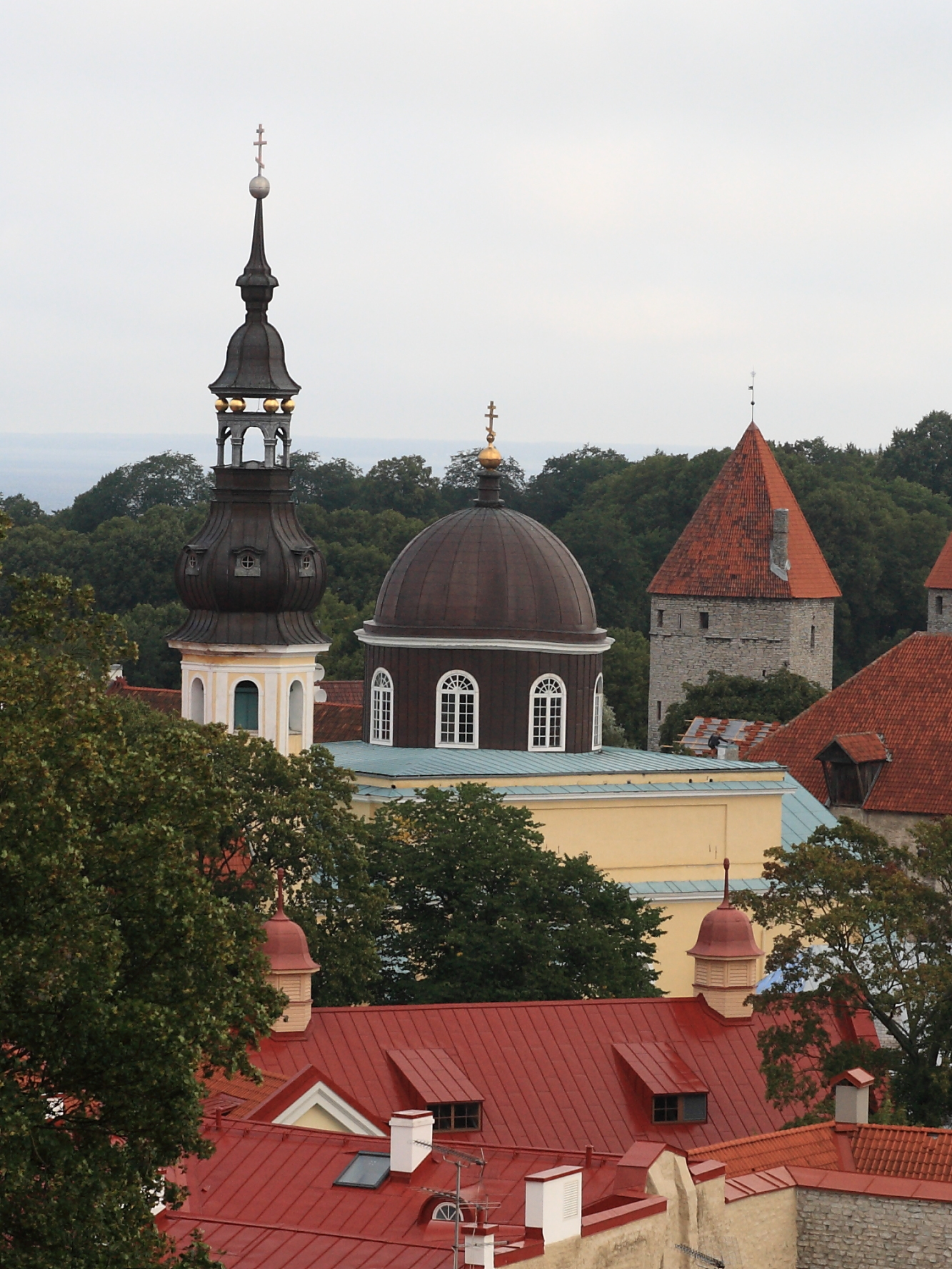
Tallinn Cathedral of the Transfiguration of Our Lord

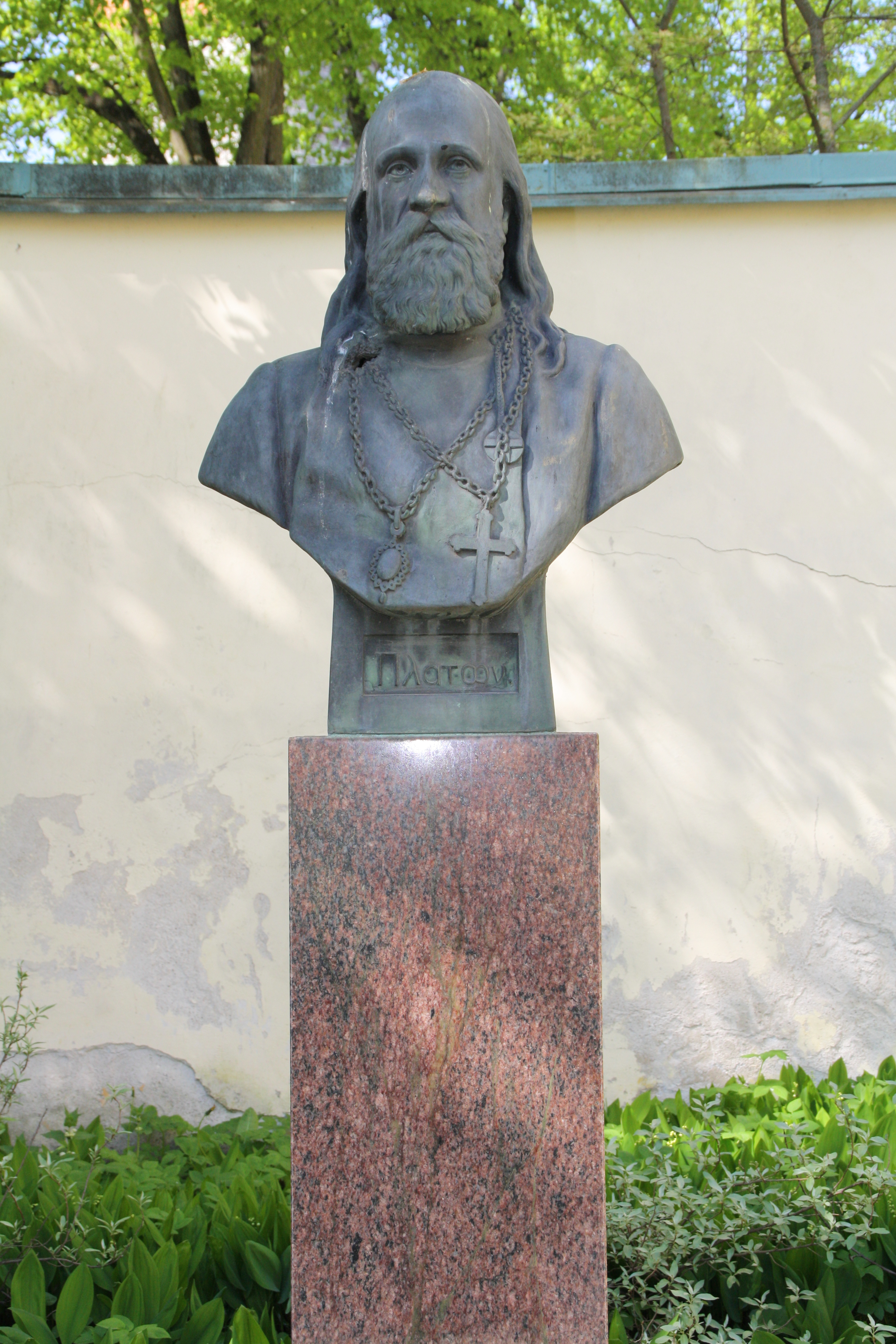
Monument for Platon

Tallinn Cathedral of the Transfiguration of Our Lord (Estonian: Tallinna Issanda Muutmise peakirik) is an Estonian Orthodox church in Tallinn, Estonia. The church is dedicated to the transfiguration of Our Lord Jesus.

The church was built in the 13th century as the main church of the St Michael's Monastery of the Cistercian Order. In 1732 the church was re-built into the Orthodox church, namely to the main church of Transfiguration of Our Lord. From 1827 to 1830 the church's interior was heavily re-built under the guidance of architects A. J. Melnikov and J. Bantelmann.

The most precious things to be found at the church are Baroque iconostasis (finished in 1719, set up in 1732), the oldest church bell in Tallinn (Matthias Beninck, from 1575), grave monument (1930-1931) and other monument (Amandus Adamson, 1920) of bishop Platon.
