= Estonian Apostolic Orthodox Church =

Member of the Eastern Orthodox Church

- Abbreviation: EAOC (EAOK)
- Type: Autocephaly (partially recognized)
- Classification: Christian
- Orientation: Eastern Orthodox
- Primate: Stephanos of Tallinn
- Language: Estonian
- Headquarters: Wismari 32, Tallinn, Estonia
- Territory: Republic of Estonia
- Independence: 1923
- Recognition: 1923, 1996 by Constantinople
- Congregations: 60 (2003)
- Members: 31,500 (2020)
- Other name: Orthodox Church of Estonia.
- Official website: Orthodox Church of Estonia

The Estonian Apostolic Orthodox Church (EAOC; Estonian: Eesti Apostlik-Õigeusu Kirik, officially the Orthodox Church of Estonia) is an Orthodox church in Estonia under the direct jurisdiction of the Ecumenical Patriarch of Constantinople. Under Estonian law it is the legal successor to the pre–World War II Estonian Orthodox Church, which in 1940 had over 210,000 members, three bishops, 156 parishes, 131 priests, 19 deacons, two monasteries, and a theological seminary; the majority of the members were ethnic Estonians.

The primate of the church is Stephanos, Metropolitan of Tallinn and all Estonia, elected in 1999.

== History ==
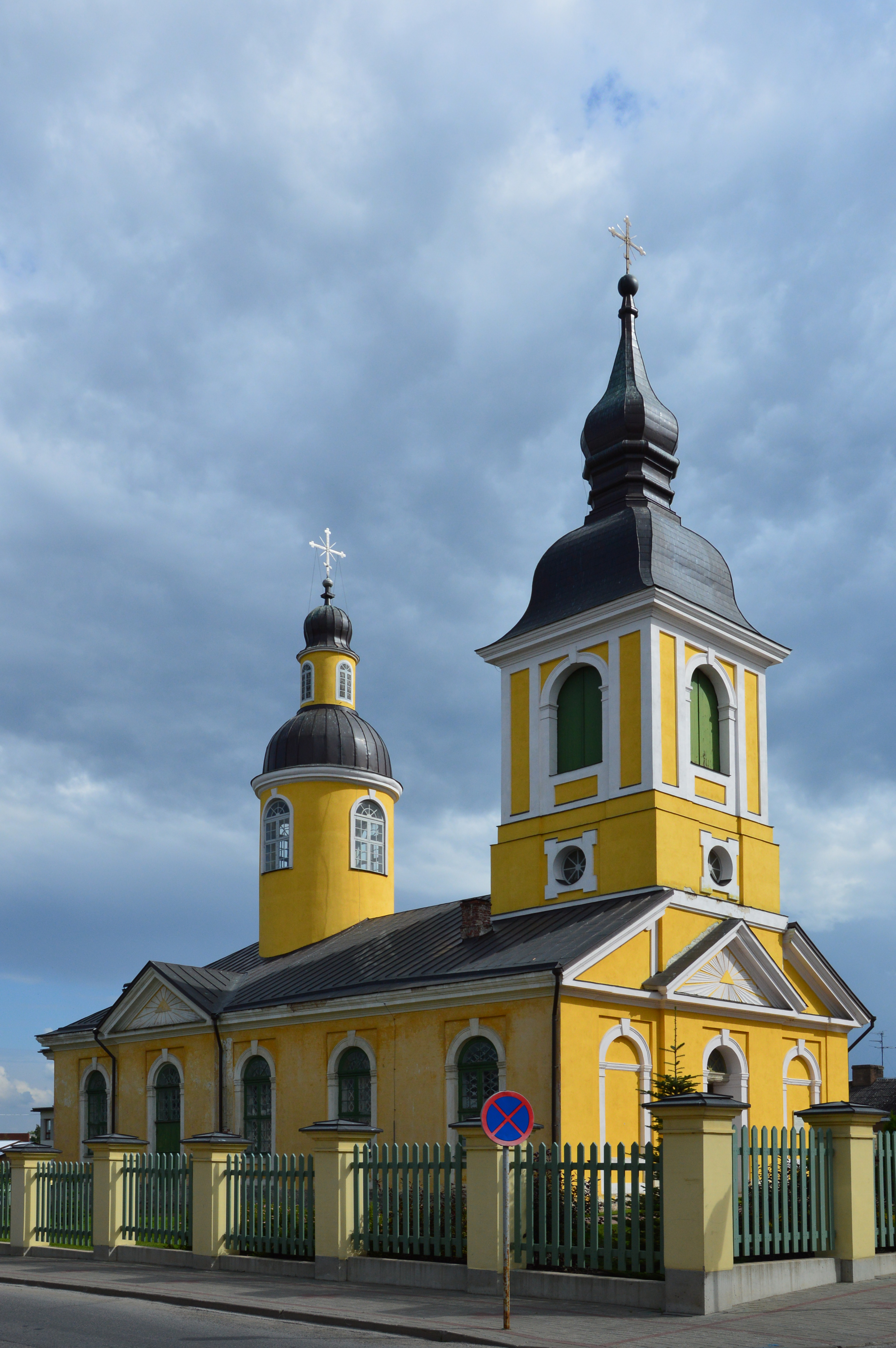
Saint Catherine's Estonian Apostolic Orthodox Church in Võru.

Little is known about the history of the church in the area until the 17th and 18th centuries, when many Old Believers fled there from Russia to avoid the liturgical reforms introduced by Patriarch Nikon of Moscow.

In the 18th and 19th centuries, Estonia was a part of the Russian Empire. In the 1850s a rumour spread that the Orthodox Church promised to provide everybody who converted to Orthodoxy a piece of land of their own somewhere in Russia. Some 65,000 Estonian peasants were converted to the Orthodox faith in the hope of obtaining land, and numerous Orthodox churches were built. Later, when the rumour turned out to be a hoax, a great part of the new Orthodox peasants returned to the Lutheran Church.

In the late 19th century, a wave of Russification was introduced, supported by the Russian hierarchy but not by the local Estonian clergy. The Cathedral of St. Alexander Nevsky in Tallinn and the Pühtitsa (Pukhtitsa) convent in Kuremäe in East Estonia were also built around this time.

=== Autonomy under the Moscow Patriarchate ===
After the Republic of Estonia was proclaimed in 1918, the Patriarch of the Russian Orthodox Church, St. Tikhon, in 1920 recognised the Estonian Apostolic Orthodox Church (EAOC) as being autonomous (Resolution No. 1780), postponing the discussion of its autocephaly. Archbishop Aleksander Paulus was elected and ordained Metropolitan of Tallinn and All Estonia, head of the EAOC.

Prior to this, Soviet Russia had adopted a Marxist–Leninist ideology which held as an ideological goal the elimination of religion and its replacement with state atheism. In response, Patriarch Tikhon had excommunicated the Soviet leadership in 1918, leading to a period of intense persecution of the Russian Orthodox Church. In April 1922, Tikhon was imprisoned, and the Estonian clergy lost contact with the Moscow Patriarchate.

=== Transfer to the Ecumenical Patriarchate ===
In September 1922 the Council of the Estonian Apostolic Orthodox Church petitioned the Patriarch of Constantinople, Meletius IV, to (1) transfer control of the Estonian church from the Russian Orthodox Church to the Patriarchate of Constantinople, and (2) clarify the Estonian church's canonical status. In 1923 the Patriarchate of Constantinople issued a tomos (ecclesiastical edict) which brought the EAOC under Constantinople's jurisdiction and granted it autonomy, but not full autocephaly.

Before 1941, one-fifth of the total Estonian population (who had been mostly Lutheran since the Reformation in the early 16th century when the country was controlled by the Teutonic Order) were Orthodox Christians under the Patriarchate of Constantinople. There were 158 parishes in Estonia and 183 clerics in the Estonian church. There was also a Chair of Orthodoxy in the Faculty of Theology at the University of Tartu. There was a Pskovo-Pechorsky Monastery in Petseri, two convents in Narva and Kuremäe, a priory in Tallinn and a seminary in Petseri. The ancient monastery in Petseri was preserved from the mass church destructions that occurred in Soviet Russia.

=== World War II ===
In 1940, Estonia was occupied by the Soviet Union, whose government undertook a general programme of the dissolution of all ecclesiastical independence within its territory. From 1942 to 1944, however, autonomy under Constantinople was temporarily revived. In 1945, a representative of the Moscow Patriarchate dismissed the members of the OCE synod who had remained in Estonia and established a new organisation, the Diocesan Council. Orthodox believers in occupied Estonia were thus subordinated to being a diocese within the Russian Orthodox Church.

Just before the second Soviet occupation in 1944 and the dissolution of the Estonian synod, the primate of the church, Metropolitan Aleksander, went into exile along with 21 clergymen and about 8,000 Orthodox believers. The Orthodox Church of Estonia in Exile with its synod in Sweden continued its activity according to the canonical statutes, until the restoration of Estonian independence in 1991. Before he died in 1953, Metr. Aleksander established his community as an exarchate under Constantinople. Most of the other bishops and clergy who remained behind were deported to Siberia. In 1958, a new synod was established in exile, and the church was organized from Sweden.

=== Inactive ===
In 1978, at the urging of the Moscow Patriarchate, the Ecumenical Patriarch declared the charter (tomos) of the Church as granted in 1923 inoperative. The church ceased to exist until the breakup of the Soviet Union, when divisions within the Orthodox community in Estonia arose between those who claimed that the Moscow Patriarchate has no jurisdiction in Estonia and those who wished to return to the jurisdiction of Moscow. The dispute often took place along ethnic lines, as many Russians had immigrated to Estonia during the Soviet occupation. Lengthy negotiations between the two patriarchates failed to produce any agreement.

=== Reactivation ===
In 1993, the synod of the Orthodox Church of Estonia in Exile was re-registered as the legal successor of the autonomous Orthodox Church of Estonia, and on February 20, 1996, the Ecumenical Patriarch Bartholomew I formally reactivated the tomos granted to the OCE in 1923, restoring its canonical subordination to the Ecumenical Patriarchate. This action brought immediate protest from the Estonian-born Patriarch Alexei II of the Moscow Patriarchate, which regarded the Estonian church as being part of its territory. The Patriarch of Moscow temporarily removed the name of the Ecumenical Patriarch from the diptychs.

In this difficult situation, the Orthodox Church of Estonia received help and support from the Finnish Orthodox Church, especially from Archbishop Johannes (Rinne) of the Archdiocese of Karelia and All Finland and Auxiliary Bishop Ambrosius (Risto Jääskeläinen) of Joensuu. The Ecumenical Patriarchate decided that Archbishop Johannes, Bishop Ambrosius and pastor Heikki Huttunen from Espoo should be available to give help in the reconstruction of the newly restored church. Archbishop Johannes would temporarily act as a deputy metropolitan (1996–1999) of the Estonian Autonomous Church.

An agreement was reached in which local congregations could choose which jurisdiction to follow. The Orthodox community in Estonia, which accounts for 16.15% of the total population, remains divided, with the majority of faithful (mostly ethnic Russians) remaining under the Russian Orthodox Church. From a U.S. Department of State report released in November 2003, about 20,000 believers (mostly ethnic Estonians) in 60 parishes are part of the church under Constantinople, with 150,000 faithful in 31 parishes, along with the monastic community of Pühtitsa, under the Russian Orthodox Church.

In 1999, the church received a resident hierarch, Metropolitan Stephanos (Charalambides) of Tallinn, formerly an auxiliary bishop under the Ecumenical Patriarchate's Metropolitan of France.

== See also ==
- Religion in Estonia
- Catholic Church in Estonia
- Eastern Orthodoxy in Estonia
- Estonian Orthodox Church of the Moscow Patriarchate

== Sources ==
- Blackwell Dictionary of Eastern Christianity, pp. 183–4
- The Estonian Apostolic Orthodox Church by Ronald Roberson, a Roman Catholic priest and scholar.
