= Internatsionalnoye =

Internatsionalnoye may refer to the following places:

== Places ==
Kazakhstan

- Internatsionalnoye, Akmola Region
- Internatsionalnoye, Jambyl Region
- Internatsionalnoye, North Kazakhstan Region
