= Orthodox schism =

Orthodox schism may refer to:

In the Eastern Orthodox churches

- One of three schisms between the Churches of Moscow and Constantinople
  - 15th–16th century Moscow–Constantinople schism over the autocephaly of the Metropolis of Moscow and all Rus' (c. 1448/1467–1560/1589)
  - 1996 Moscow–Constantinople schism over the autocephaly of the Estonian Apostolic Orthodox Church (almost 3 months)
  - 2018 Moscow–Constantinople schism, Orthodox Schism, or Eastern Schism, over the autocephaly of the Orthodox Church of Ukraine (2018–present; ongoing)
- One of three schisms between the Church of Rome and the Church of Constantinople
  - Acacian Schism, or Rome–Constantinople schism of 484
  - Photian Schism, or Rome–Constantinople schism of 863
  - East–West Schism, Great Schism, or (Rome–Constantinople) Schism of 1054 (ongoing)
- The union accomplished at the Council of Florence of the Patriarchate of Constantinople to the Catholic Church
- Schism of the Russian Church or Raskol, the splitting of the Russian Orthodox Church into an official church and the Old Believers movements in the mid-17th century (1653/1667–present; ongoing)
- Schism between Constantinople and the Serbian Orthodox Church (1882–1920; 38 years)
- Schism between Constantinople and the Greek Orthodox Church (1833–1850; 17 years)
- Schism between Constantinople and the Bulgarian Orthodox Church (1872–1945; 73 years)
- Schism between Moscow and the Georgian Orthodox Church (1917–1943; 26 years)
- Schism between Moscow and the Polish Orthodox Church (1924–1948; 24 years)
- Schism between the Serbian Orthodox Church and the Macedonian Orthodox Church (1967–2022; 55 years)
- Schism between Antioch and Jerusalem (2014-2023; 9 years)

In the Oriental Orthodox churches

- Schisms within the Malankara Church

== See also ==
- Schism (disambiguation)
- Eastern Orthodox Church
- Category:Schisms from the Eastern Orthodox Church
- Oriental Orthodox Churches
