= Alexander Nevsky church, Haapsalu =

Church building in Haapsalu, Estonia

Coordinates: 58°56′27″N 23°32′15″E

Alexander Nevsky Church
- Neeva Aleksandri kirik
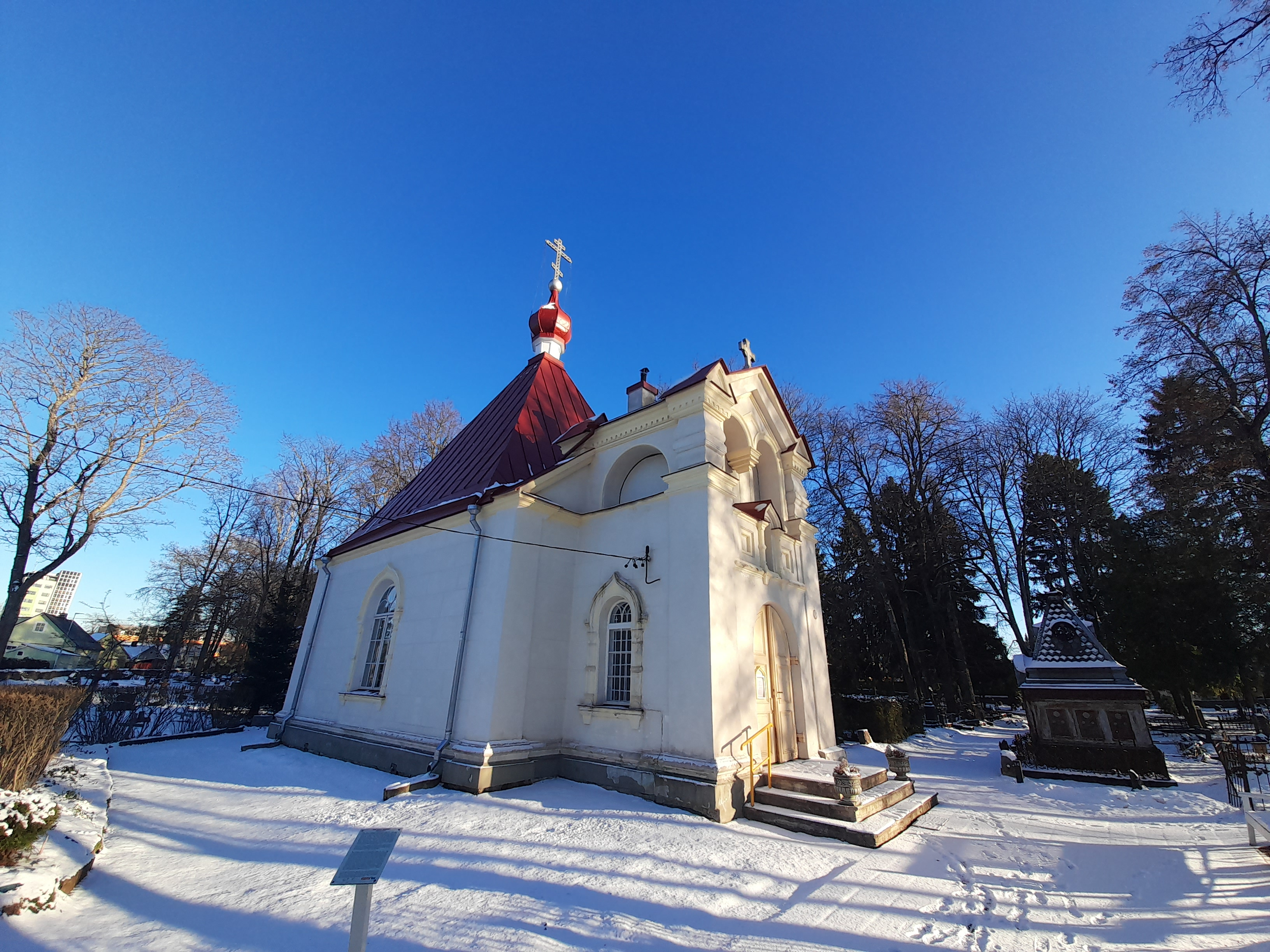
- Alexander Nevsky Church, Haapsalu
- Alexander Nevsky Church
- Location: Haapsalu
- Country: Estonia
- Denomination: Eastern Orthodox Church
- Website: http://nevski.ee

History
- Founded: 1896
- Consecrated: 1897

Architecture
- Architect: Alexander Krasovsky
- Years built: 1896-1900

Clergy
- Priest: hieromonk Innocent (Glazistov)

The Alexander Nevsky Church (Estonian: Aleksander Nevski kirik, Russian: Александро-Невская церковь (Хаапсалу)) is an orthodox church in the Haapsalu old cemetery, Estonia. It was built to a design by Alexander Krasovsky in a typical Russian Revival style between 1896 and 1897, during the period when the country was part of the Russian Empire. It is dedicated to Saint Alexander Nevsky who in 1242 won the Battle of the Ice on Lake Peipus, in the territorial waters of present-day Estonia. The late Estonian Metropolitan, Cornelius (Jakobs), started his priestly ministry in the church.

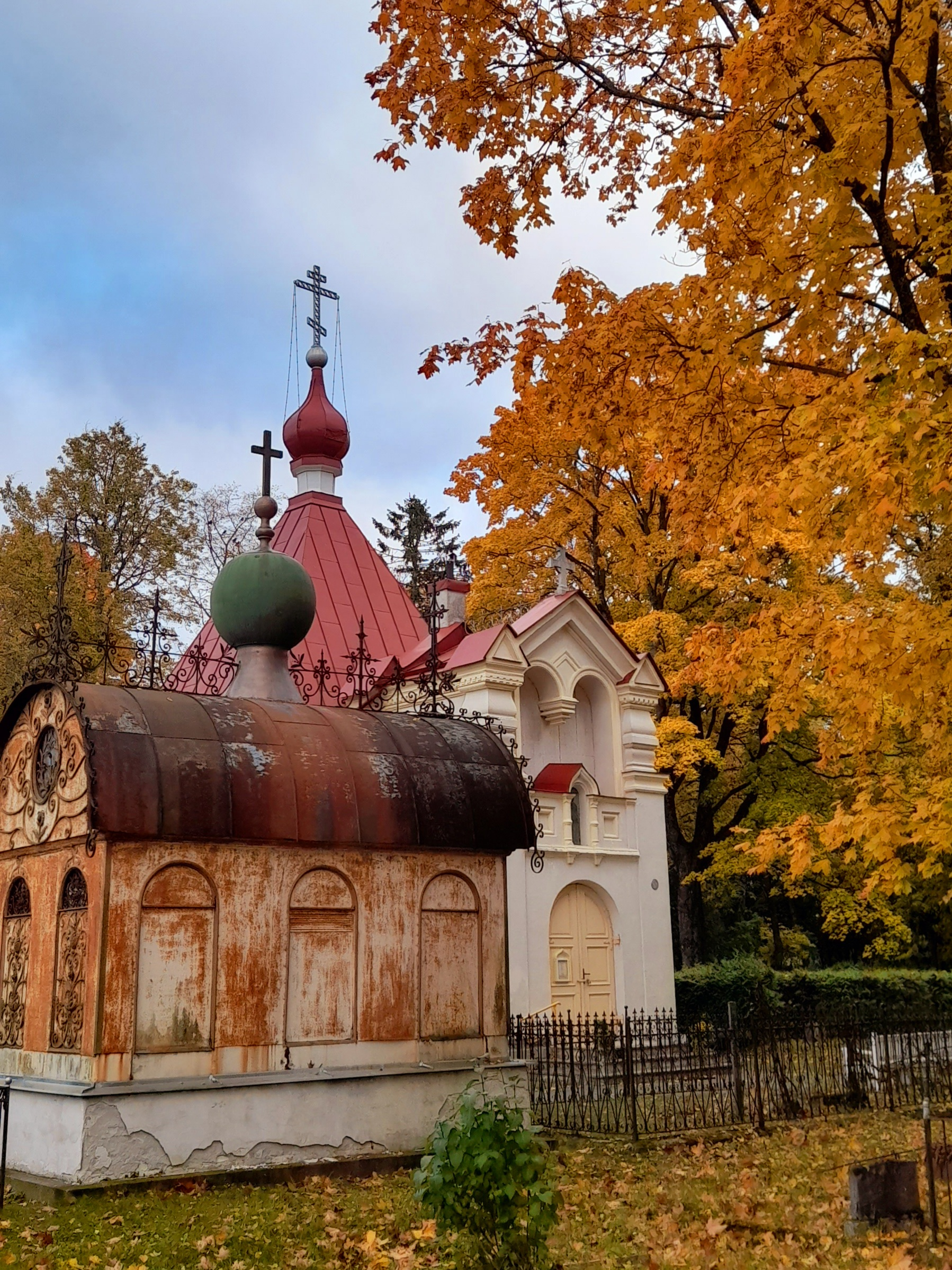
Nevski church on cemetery

== Story ==
In 1896, a chapel was built in the old cemetery of Haapsalu, consecrated in honor of St. Prince Alexander Nevsky. The chapel was consecrated on July 6, 1897. It was rebuilt into a church according to the project of the architect Krasovsky in 1899–1900, an altar and a five bell tower were added. Donations for the construction of the temple were made by many nobles and cultural figures, including Alexei Vekshin, a merchant and owner of mines. The cemetery church was used as a place of worship in cold weather and as a funeral church all year round.

In the 50s of the 20th century, under the rector priest Vyacheslav Yakobs, lighting was carried out in the temple and a stove was installed. It became possible to perform divine services in this temple in the winter.

In 1962, when, according to Soviet laws, it was impossible to have ascribed churches, the Alexander Nevsky Church was closed, and the property was transferred to the Intercession Church in the city of Kiviyli.

In 1964, the Church of Mary Magdalene was closed, but the parish received the use of the Alexander Nevsky Church. The relevant agreement was signed between the Haapsalu city executive committee and the parish. The resettlement took place in August–September 1964. Since the church was damaged during two years of inactivity, a quick internal restoration was carried out, during which the ceiling paintings were restored. Since that time, the parish has received a double name - the parish of Mary Magdalene - Alexander Nevsky. In 1994, the parish split into supporters of the Moscow and Constantinople Patriarchates. Since that time, in the Magdalenian Church - the parish of the Patriarchate of Constantinople, and in the Alexander Nevsky - of Moscow

On August 4, 2001, after a major overhaul of the altar, the Alexander Nevsky Church was consecrated with the hierarchal rank by metropolitan Cornelius.

The archives of the parish (metrics and chronicle) are located in the Tartu Historical Archive, archive f.1884.

== See also ==
- List of churches in Estonia
- Alexander Nevsky Cathedral, Tallinn
