= Esil District =

Esil District may also refer to:

- Esil District, North Kazakhstan Region, a district of North Kazakhstan Region in Kazakhstan.
- Esil District, Akmola Region, a district of Akmola Region in Kazakhstan.
- Esil District, Astana, a district of Astana city in Kazakhstan
