= East–West split =

East–West split may refer to the following topics:

- The East–West Schism in Christianity
- The separation of the Roman Empire into the Western Roman Empire and Eastern Roman Empire
- East-west cultural debate

== See also ==
- Rome–Constantinople schism (disambiguation)
