= Internatsionalnoye, Akmola Region =

Internatsionalnoye
- Village
- Location within Kazakhstan
- Coordinates: 51°37′58″N 65°47′30″E
- Country: Kazakhstan
- Region: Akmola Region
- District: Esil District

Population (2009)
  - Total: 509
- Time zone: UTC+5 (UTC + 5)

Internatsionalnoye (Kazakh: Интернациональное; Russian: Интернациональное) is a village in northern-central Kazakhstan. It is located in the Esil District in Akmola Region. Population: 509 (2009 census results);671 (1999 census results).

== Notable people ==
- Eugene (Reshetnikov), bishop of the Russian Orthodox Church
