= Moscow–Constantinople schism =

The Moscow–Constantinople schism refers to any of three schisms within the Eastern Orthodox Church wherein the Russian Orthodox Church (or one of its preceding entities) severed full communion with the Ecumenical Patriarchate of Constantinople:

- 15th–16th century Moscow–Constantinople schism, between the Ecumenical Patriarchate and its Metropolis of Kiev and all Rus' (which later became the Moscow Patriarchate)
- 1996 Moscow–Constantinople schism, over a dispute concerning canonical jurisdiction over Estonia
- 2018 Moscow–Constantinople schism, over a dispute concerning canonical jurisdiction over Ukraine

== See also ==
- Moscow, third Rome, the Russian assertion of de facto primacy in the Eastern Orthodox communion following the 1453 fall of Constantinople
- Orthodox schism (disambiguation)
- Raskol, the 17th-century schism within the Russian Orthodox Church with anti-Reform members which eventually led to the formation of the Old Believers sects
- Rome–Constantinople schism (disambiguation)
- Third Rome
