= Estonian Church =

The Estonian Church may refer to:

- The Estonian Evangelical Lutheran Church
- The Estonian Apostolic Orthodox Church, also officially known as the Orthodox Church of Estonia.
- The Estonian Orthodox Church of the Moscow Patriarchate
