= Eugene Reshetnikov =

Russian clergyman

Eugene
- Metropolitan of Tallinn and All Estonia
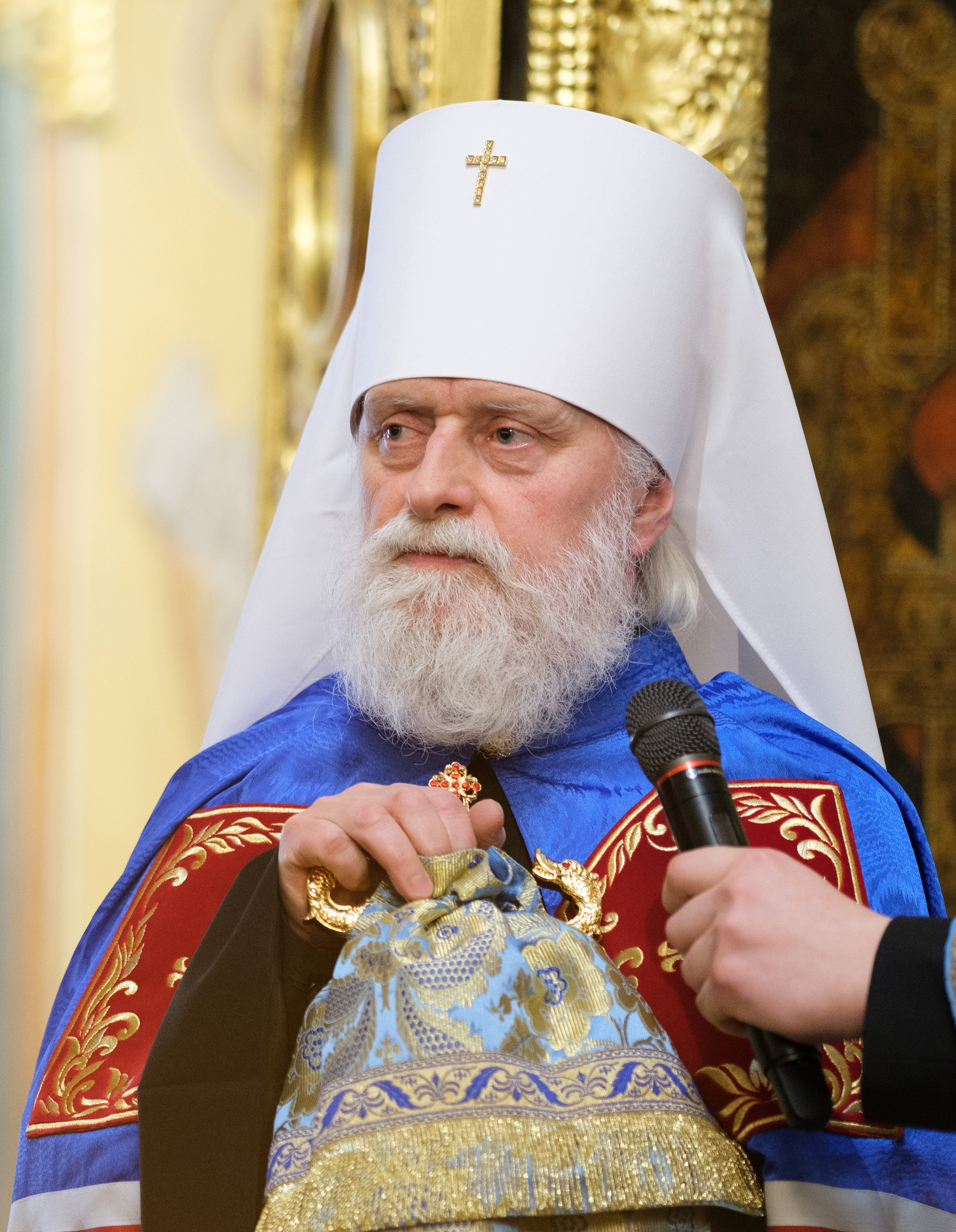
- Native name: Валерий Германович Решетников
- Church: Russian Orthodox Church
- Metropolis: Estonian Orthodox Church of the Moscow Patriarchate
- Elected: Metropolitan of Tallinn and All Estonia: 5 May 2018

Orders
- Ordination: 16 April 1994
- Rank: Metropolitan

Personal details
- Born: Valery Germanovich Reshetnikov; October 9, 1957 (age 69) Mayakovskiy, Esil District, Akmola Region, Kazakh SSR, USSR
- Denomination: Eastern Orthodox Church
- Education: Moscow Theological Seminary

Metropolitan Eugene (Russian: Митрополит Евгений, Estonian: Metropoliit Jevgeni secular name Valery Germanovich Reshetnikov, Russian: Валерий Германович Решетников; born October 9, 1957) is a bishop of the Russian Orthodox Church, Metropolitan of Tallinn and All Estonia and primate of the Estonian Orthodox Church of the Moscow Patriarchate (since 2018), former rector of Moscow Theological Academy (1995–2018) and Chairman of the Educational Committee of the Holy Synod (1994–2018). After on January 18, 2024, Estonia announced that it would not renew Reshetnikov's residence permit Reshetnikov left Estonia on February 6, 2024. His residence permit was evoked because he was assessed to be a security risk due to his justification of Russia’s invasion of Ukraine and his defense of the Russian government.

== Biography ==
=== Early life ===
Born on October 9, 1957, in Esil District, Akmola Region of the Kazakh Soviet Socialist Republic. He spent his adolescent and youthful years in Kirov. After completing eight years of high school, he studied at the Kirov builder's college (Кировский строительный техникум). From 1977 to 1979, he served in the Soviet Army. After the demobilization, he worked in the Kirov diocesan administration, while acting as subdeacon of Bishop Chrysanth (Chepil) of Kirov.

In 1980, he entered the Moscow Theological Seminary. He performed the job of subdeacon of the Rector of the Moscow Theological Schools, Bishop Alexander (Timofeyev). In 1983 he graduated from the Moscow Theological Seminary and entered the Moscow Theological Academy. In 1987, he received his doctorate in theology, after defending his thesis "Pastorhood in the Russian Church in the Tenth to Thirteenth Centuries" (Russian: "Пастырство в Русской Церкви в X-XIII веках").

On July 27, 1986, archimandrite Benedict (Knyazev) tonsured him a monk with the name Eugene in honour of hieromartyr Eugene of Chersonesus. On August 3, he was ordained hierodeacon, then on August 28 he was ordained hieromonk.

In March 1988, the day of Pascha, he was elevated to the rank of hegumen. On January 1, 1989, he was elevated to the rank of archimandrite and was appointed Vice-Chancellor of the Moscow Theological Schools for administrative work. On November 16, 1990, was appointed inspector of Moscow Theological Seminary.

On August 6, 1991, by decree of Patriarch Alexius II, he was appointed rector of the Stavropol Theological Seminary.

On February 28, 1994, by decision of the Holy Synod, he was appointed Acting Chairman of the Education Committee of the Russian Orthodox Church with the dismissal of the Rector of the Stavropol Theological Seminary and elected bishop of Vereya, Vicar of the Moscow Diocese.

=== Titular bishop of Vereyа ===
On April 16, 1994, in Epiphany Cathedral at Yelokhovo, Moscow, he was consecrated Bishop of Vereyа, vicar of the Moscow diocese.

On July 18, 1995, was appointed rector of the Moscow Theological Schools with preservation of the post of Chairman of the Education Committee.

On July 18, 1998, the Holy Synod approve him as Chairman of the Education Committee.

On February 25, 2000, Patriarch Alexy II of Moscow elevated him to the rank of archbishop.

Guided by the decisions of the Bishops' Councils of the Russian Orthodox Church, as well as definitions of the Holy Synod and the instructions of the Patriarch, he headed the reform of theological schools of Russian Orthodox Church to transform theological seminaries as higher education schools, and theological academies as specialized educational institutions for training of scientific and theological personnel and teachers of theological and educational institutions. The process of reforming theological education was worked out in Moscow theological schools, the experience of which was then applied in other religious educational institutions of the Russian Orthodox Church.

From 2004 to 2007 he was member of the dialogue commission between the Moscow Patriarchate and Russian Orthodox Church Outside Russia.

On March 22, 2011, he became member of then established Supreme Church Council of the Russian Orthodox Church.

=== Metropolitan of Tallinn and All Estonia ===
On May 5, 2018, at the meeting of the Synod of the Estonian Orthodox Church of the Moscow Patriarchate he was elected one of the two candidates for the post of Primate of the Estonian Orthodox Church. The Holy Synod of the Russian Orthodox Church approved this decision at a meeting on May 14. On May 29, 2018, an Extraordinary Council of the Estonian Orthodox Church of the Moscow Patriarchate elected him its Primate. On 3 June 2018, during the divine liturgy at the Cathedral of Christ the Saviour in Moscow, Patriarch Kirill of Moscow and all Russia elevated him to the rank of Metropolitan and awarded the right to wear the second Panagia within the Estonian Orthodox Church. On July 14, the Holy Synod dismissed him Chairman of the Educational Committee of the Russian Orthodox Church and rector of the Moscow Theological Schools.

After becoming Metropolitan of Tallinn and All Estonia, he began to study Estonian and applied for a residence permit in Estonia.

In March 2022, he signed a statement concerning Russia's invasion of Ukraine (the previous month), but in a later interview that month he insisted that his interpretation of the document radically differed from that of his co-signatories.

On January 18, 2024 Estonia announced that it would not renew Reshetnikov's residence permit, stating "His actions are a security risk to Estonia." The Estonian Police said that he had been repeatedly asked to stop justifying Russia’s invasion of Ukraine and to stop defending the Russian government, but that he "has consistently vindicated and supported the Kremlin regime's bloody aggression against Ukraine." The lack of renewal required Reshetnikov to leave Estonia before the expiration of his residence permit on February 6, 2024. Reshetnikov called the decision "political" and vowed that he would continue working remotely if he returned to Russia.

Metropolitan Eugene left Estonia on February 6, 2024. At his farewell liturgy in the Alexander Nevsky Cathedral in Tallinn, he led the ordination of his former personal secretary, Archpriest Daniel Lepisk to the rank of bishop of the city of Tartu.

== Published works ==
- Слово на торжественном собрании профессорско-преподавательского состава и учащихся Московских Духовных школ 1 сентября 1996 года // Журнал Московской Патриархии. М., 1996. — № 12. — С. 38-40.
- Приветствие от Учебного комитета при Священном Синоде и МДА [юбил. конф. СПбДАиС. 25-26 дек. 1996 г.] // Христианское чтение. М., 1997. — № 14. — С. 18-19.
- Проблемы, стоящие перед духовными школами: [Докл. на юбил. конф. СПбДАиС. 25-26 дек. 1996 г.] // Христианское чтение. М., 1997. — № 14. — С. 42-46.
- Доклад на Архиерейском Соборе // Журнал Московской Патриархии. М., 1997. — № 6. — С. 28-32.
- Святитель Иннокентий и Троице-Сергиева Лавра // Журнал Московской Патриархии. М., 1997. — № 11. — С. 49-55.
- Взаимодействие Учебного комитета и Отдела религиозного образования и катехизации Московского Патриархата // Рождественские чтения, 6-е. М., 1998. — С. 64-70.
- Образование и культура. К вопросу об историческом опыте // Сборник пленарных докладов VII Международных Рождественских образовательных чтений. — М. : Отдел религиозного образования и катехизации Русской Православной Церкви, 1999. — 288 с. — С. 87-94.
- Актуальные проблемы богословского образования: [Докл. на Богосл. конф. «Православное богословие на пороге третьего тысячелетия». Москва, 7-9 февр. 2000 г.] // Церковь и время. М., 2000. — № 2(11). — С. 222—236.
- Новая концепция учебной деятельности Русской Православной Церкви // Исторический вестник. М., 2000. — № 7(11). — С. 65-73.
- Религия и наука: Путь к знанию // Сборник пленарных докладов VIII Международных Рождественских образовательных чтений. — М. : Отдел религиозного образования и катехизации Русской Православной Церкви, 2000. — 280 с. — С. 123—129.
- О состоянии и перспективах духовного образования: Доклад на Архиерейском соборе Русской православной церкви (Москва, 13-16 августа 2000 г.) // Вестник высшей школы. 2000. — № 8
- Некоторые проблемы истории и современного состояния образования в России // Журнал Московской Патриархии. М., 2000. — № 12. — С. 45-50.
- Возрождение классического образования // Сборник пленарных докладов IX Международных Рождественских образовательных чтений. — М. : Отдел религиозного образования и катехизации Русской Православной Церкви, 2001. — 304 с. — С. 104—110
- Церковная российская система образования: концептуальные основы взаимоотношений // Сборник пленарных докладов Х Международных Рождественских образовательных чтений. — М. : Отдел религиозного образования и катехизации Русской Православной Церкви, 2002. — 352 с. — С. 74-88
- Вступительное слово // Практика тюремного служения: Материалы семинара, Московская Духовная Академия, 18 — 19 сентября 2001 года / Учебный Комитет Русской Православной Церкви, Московская духовная академия, Общество милосердия в тюрьмах «Вера, Надежда, Любовь» во имя Святителя Николая Чудотворца. — Сергиев Посад : [б. и.], 2002. — С. 3—5
- Интеграция богословского образования Русской Православной Церкви в систему российского образования // Сборник пленарных докладов ХI Международных Рождественских образовательных чтений / ред. архим. Иоанн (Экономцев), сост., ред. В. Л. Шленов, сост., ред. Л. Г. Петрушина. — М.: Отдел религиозного образования и катехизации Русской Православной Церкви, 2003. — 384 с. — С. 84—92.
- Проблемы высшего богословского образования в России. Интервью швейцарскому журналу «Glaube in der 2. Welt» («Вера во втором мире») // Богословский вестник. 2003. — № 3. — С. 224—236
- Богословское образование в России: история, современность, перспективы: юбилейный сборник. — М. : Учебный Комитет Русской Православной Церкви: Московская Духовная Академия, 2004. — 132 с. — ISBN 5-900249-39-5
- Академическая реформа // Богословский вестник. 2004. — № 4 — С. 344—353
- Проповедь перед чином прощения // Богословский вестник. 2004. — № 4 — С. 373—378
- Актуальные проблемы богословского образования // Православное богословие на пороге третьего тысячелетия: материалы / Богословская конференция Русской Православной Церкви. Москва, 7 — 9 февраля 2000 г. — М.: Синодальная Богословская комиссия, 2005. — 462 с. — С. 186—198.
- Проповедь в день выпуска // Богословский вестник. 2005. — № 5-6 — С. 413—417
- Таинство Покаяния: богословские аспекты // Православное учение о Церковных Таинствах: V Международная богословская конференция Русской православной церкви (Москва, 13-16 ноября 2007 г.). — Т. 3 : Брак. Покаяние. Елеосвящение. Таинства и тайнодействия. — М. : Синодальная библейско-богословская комиссия, 2009. — С. 167—176
- Труды святителя Иннокентия Московского по развитию духовного просвещения и образования в Русской Америке и на Дальнем Востоке // По стопам графа Н. Н. Муравьева-Амурского и святителя Иннокентия (Вениаминова) — возродим родной край: материалы научно-практической конференции. Хабаровск, 10 июня 2008 года. — Хабаровск : Хабаровская духовная семинария, 2009. — С. 163—177
- Академические юбилеи // Богословский вестник. 2010. — № 11-12. — С. 23—35
- В поисках начала: к 70-летнему юбилею возрождения Московской духовной академии // Богословский вестник. 2013. — № 13 — С. 21-24
- Доклад на торжественном акте, посвященном 200-летию перевода Московской духовной академии в Троице-Сергиеву Лавру // Гуманитарные науки в теологическом пространстве: Взаимодействие духовного и светского образования в России на примере Московской духовной академии с начала XIX в. по настоящее время : Сборник статей в честь 200-летнего юбилея пребывания Московской духовной академии в Троице-Сергиевой Лавре. — Сергиев Посад : Московская духовная академия и семинария, 2015. — С. 37-51
- Проповедь о монашеском призвании в современном мире // Богословский вестник. — Сергиев Посад: Московская духовная академия и семинария. — 2016. — № 20-21. — С. 363—367
- Московская Духовная Академия в 1917—1918 учебном году: На пути к мученичеству // Богословский вестник. — Сергиев Посад : Московская духовная академия и семинария. 2017. — № 26-27. — С. 21-41
- Основные значения термина «богословие» (θεολογία) и их роль в высшем богословском образовании // Теология и образование: 2018: ежегодник Научно-образовательной теологической ассоциации / Общецерковная аспирантура и докторантура им. свв. Кирилла и Мефодия, Национальный исследовательский ядерный университет «МИФИ»; ред. митр. Иларион. — М. : Издательский дом «Познание», 2018. — С. 50-60

== Sources ==
- Евгений, архиепископ Верейский, викарий Московской епархии (Решетников Валерий Германович)
