= Rome–Constantinople schism =

Rome–Constantinople schism may refer to:

- Rome–Constantinople schism of 484, also known in Western sources as the Acacian Schism
- Rome–Constantinople schism of 863, also known in Western sources as the Photian Schism
- Rome–Constantinople schism of 1054, also known as the Great East-West Schism

== See also ==
- Moscow–Constantinople schism (disambiguation)
- Orthodox schism (disambiguation)
- Schism (disambiguation)
