= Schismatic =

Schismatic may refer to:

- Schismatic (religion), a member of a religious schism, or, as an adjective, of or pertaining to a schism
- a term related to the Covenanters, a 17th-century Scottish Presbyterian movement
- pertaining to the schisma in music
- Schismatic temperament

== See also ==
- Schism (disambiguation)
