= Esil =

- Town
- Location in Kazakhstan
- Coordinates: 51°57′20″N 66°24′15″E
- Country: Kazakhstan
- Region: Aqmola Region
- District: Esil District

Population (2009)
  - Total: 11,551
- Time zone: UTC+05:00 (Kazakhstan Time)

Esil (Kazakh: Есіл, Esıl; Russian: Есиль) is a town in northern-central Kazakhstan. The seat of Esil District in Aqmola Region, it is located on the right bank of the Ishim River (known as the Esil in Kazakh). Population: 11,551 (2009 census results);13,096 (1999 census results).

== Climate ==
Climate data for Esil (1991–2020)
Month	Jan	Feb	Mar	Apr	May	Jun	Jul	Aug	Sep	Oct	Nov	Dec	Year
Mean daily maximum °C (°F)	−10.9 (12.4)	−9.5 (14.9)	−2.0 (28.4)	12.5 (54.5)	21.9 (71.4)	26.6 (79.9)	27.4 (81.3)	26.3 (79.3)	19.8 (67.6)	11.1 (52.0)	−1.4 (29.5)	−8.5 (16.7)	9.4 (48.9)
Daily mean °C (°F)	−15.5 (4.1)	−14.5 (5.9)	−6.9 (19.6)	5.9 (42.6)	14.5 (58.1)	19.5 (67.1)	20.6 (69.1)	19.0 (66.2)	12.4 (54.3)	4.7 (40.5)	−5.7 (21.7)	−12.9 (8.8)	3.4 (38.1)
Mean daily minimum °C (°F)	−20.0 (−4.0)	−19.2 (−2.6)	−11.4 (11.5)	0.0 (32.0)	7.0 (44.6)	12.1 (53.8)	13.9 (57.0)	12.0 (53.6)	5.7 (42.3)	−0.5 (31.1)	−9.5 (14.9)	−17.3 (0.9)	−2.3 (27.9)
Average precipitation mm (inches)	13.0 (0.51)	11.9 (0.47)	15.4 (0.61)	19.5 (0.77)	32.8 (1.29)	35.8 (1.41)	51.8 (2.04)	28.7 (1.13)	17.1 (0.67)	22.0 (0.87)	21.6 (0.85)	17.7 (0.70)	287.3 (11.31)
Average precipitation days (≥ 1.0 mm)	4.1	3.9	4.2	4.6	6.5	5.7	7.3	5.6	3.5	5.1	5.8	5.4	61.7
Source: NOAA
