= Estonian Christian Orthodox Church =

Self-governed church of Russian Orthodox Church

- Eesti Kristlik Õigeusu Kirik
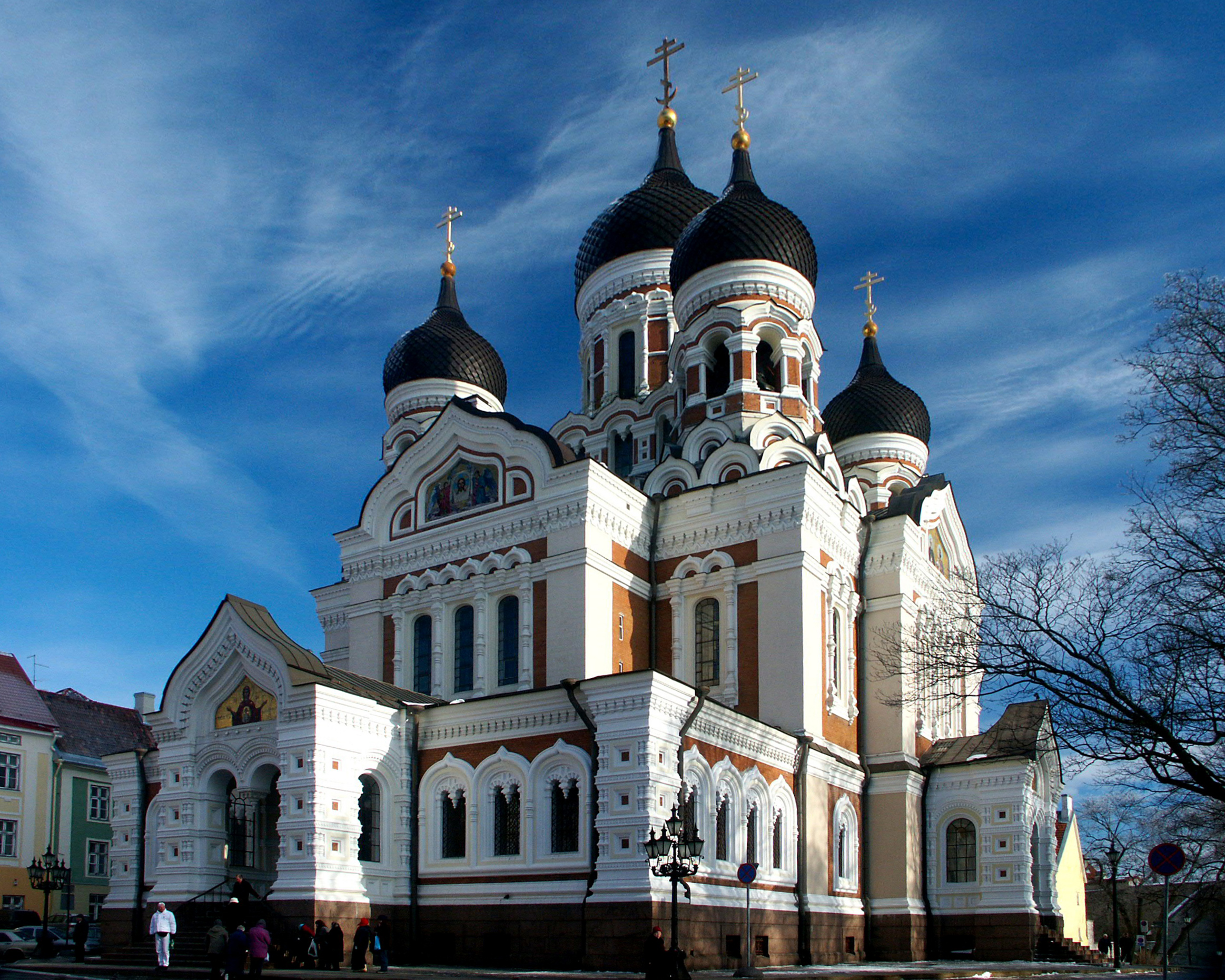
- Alexander Nevsky Cathedral, Tallinn
- Type: Autocephaly (partially recognized)
- Classification: Christian
- Orientation: Eastern Orthodox
- Theology: Eastern Orthodox theology
- Primate: Eugene (Reshetnikov)
- Bishop of Tallinn: Daniel (Lepisk)
- Language: Russian, Estonian
- Liturgy: Byzantine Rite
- Headquarters: Tallinn, Estonia
- Territory: Estonia
- Founder: Russian Orthodox Church
- Origin: 11 August 1992; Moscow, Russia
- Independence: 20 August 2024 (de facto)
- Recognition: 1992 by Moscow Synod; 2002 registered in Estonia
- Congregations: 38 (2021)
- Members: 170,000 (2020)
- Other name: Estonian Orthodox Church of the Moscow Patriarchate (1992–2025)
- Official website: Orthodox.ee

The Estonian Christian Orthodox Church (ECOC (Note: Estonian: Eesti Kristlik Õigeusu Kirik or EKÕK. Russian: Эстонская Православная Христианская Церковь, romanized: Yestonkaja Pravoslavnaja Khristianskaja Tserkov' or "ЭПХЦ".)), until March 2025 named the Estonian Orthodox Church of the Moscow Patriarchate (EOC MP (Note: Estonian: Moskva Patriarhaadi Eesti Õigeusu Kirik. Russian: Эстонская православная церковь Московского патриархата.)), is an Eastern Orthodox church operating in Estonia. Until 2024, it was a semi-autonomous church in the canonical jurisdiction of the Patriarchate of Moscow whose primate was appointed by the Holy Synod of the latter. Due to rising tensions over the Moscow Patriarchate's open support for the Russian invasion of Ukraine and the Estonian government and parliament's concerns over the Estonian Orthodox Church's ties to Moscow, the church unilaterally declared its independence on 20 August 2024, and to emphasise its commitment to fully comply with the laws of Estonia; it went on to formally change its name to "Estonian Christian Orthodox Church".

This church numbers roughly 150,000 faithful in 31 congregations and is the largest Eastern Orthodox church in Estonia. The primate of the church was Cornelius (Jakobs), Metropolitan of Tallinn and All Estonia, from 1992 to his death in 2018. Since 2018 the head of this church is Metropolitan Eugene (Reshetnikov). After his residence permit was not renewed by Estonian authorities (due to his alleged defending of the "Kremlin regime and Russia's military actions") Reshetnikov left Estonia on February 6, 2024. He stated that he would continue working remotely when back in Russia.

Under Estonian law, another church – the Estonian Apostolic Orthodox Church (Eesti Apostlik-Õigeusu Kirik) – is the legal successor to the pre-World War II Estonian Orthodox Church, which in 1940 had had over 210,000 faithful, three bishops, 156 parishes, 131 priests, 19 deacons, two monasteries, and a theological seminary, the majority of the faithful being ethnic Estonians. The EAOC's primate is confirmed by the Orthodox Church of Constantinople and numbers about 20,000 faithful in 60 congregations today. The reactivation of this autonomous Estonian Orthodox Church caused the Russian Orthodox Church to sever full communion with the Ecumenical Patriarchate of Constantinople in 1996 for several months.

== History ==
=== Christianisation ===
Orthodox missionaries from Novgorod and Pskov were active among the Estonians in the southeast regions of the area, closest to Pskov, in the 10th through 12th centuries. As a result of the Northern Crusades in the beginning of the 13th century, Estonia fell under the control of Western Christianity. However, Russian merchants were later able to set up small Orthodox congregations in several Estonian towns. In 1472, one such congregation was expelled from the town of Dorpat (Tartu) by the Germans, who martyred their priest, Isidor, along with a number of Orthodox faithful (the group is commemorated liturgically on January 8).

Little is known about the history of the church in the area until the 17th and 18th centuries, when many Old Believers fled there from Russia to avoid the liturgical reforms introduced by Patriarch Nikon of Moscow.

=== Imperial Russia ===
In the 18th and 19th centuries, Estonia was a part of the Imperial Russian Empire, having been conquered by the emperor Peter the Great. A significant number of Estonian peasants were converted to the Orthodox faith in the (unfulfilled) hope of obtaining land, and numerous Eastern Orthodox churches were built. In 1850 the Diocese of Riga (in Latvia) was established by the Russian Orthodox Church and many Estonian Orthodox believers were included. In the late 19th century, a wave of Russification was introduced, supported by the Russian hierarchy but not by the local Estonian clergy. The Cathedral of St. Alexander Nevsky in Tallinn and the Pühtitsa Convent (Pukhtitsa) in Kuremäe in East Estonia were also built around this time.

In 1917 the first Estonian, Platon (Paul Kulbusch), was ordained Bishop of Riga and Vicar of Tallinn.

=== Interwar Estonia ===
After the Estonian Republic was proclaimed in 1918, the Patriarch of the Russian Orthodox Church, St. Tikhon, in 1920 recognised the Orthodox Church of Estonia (OCE) as being independent. Archbishop Aleksander Paulus was elected and ordained as the head of the Estonian church. Soon after, the Estonian church lost contact with Moscow due to the intense religious persecution of the Russian Orthodox Church by the new Leninist regime. In September 1922 the Council of the Estonian Apostolic Orthodox Church took the decision to address the Patriarch of Constantinople, Meletius IV (Metaxakis) of Constantinople, with a petition to adopt the Estonian Orthodox Church under the jurisdiction of the Patriarchate of Constantinople and to declare it autocephalous. Later on the Metropolitan of Tallinn and all Estonia Alexander wrote that it was done under an intense pressure of the state. On 7 July 1923 in Constantinople Meletios Metaxakis presented the Tomos on the adoption of Estonian Orthodox Church under the jurisdiction of the Patriarchate of Constantinople as a separate church autonomy "Estonian Orthodox Metropolia".

At the suggestion of the Patriarchate of Constantinople, Estonia was divided into three dioceses, Tallinn, Narva and Pechery. Evsevy (Drozdov) became the head of Narva cathedra. John (Bulin), a graduate of St. Petersburg Theological Academy, became Bishop of Pechery in 1926. He headed the diocese until 1932 and left it because of the disagreements on the properties of the Pskov-Pechery Monastery. Bishop John spent several years in Yugoslavia and came back to Estonia in the late 1930s. He actively backed the return of the Estonian Orthodox Church to the jurisdiction of the Moscow Patriarchate. On 18 October 1940, Bishop John was arrested by the NKVD in Pechery, accused of anti-Soviet agitation and propaganda, and was executed on 30 July 1941 in Leningrad.

Before 1941, one fifth of the total Estonian population (who had been mostly Lutheran since the Reformation in the early 16th century when the country was controlled by the Teutonic Order) were Orthodox Christians under the Ecumenical Patriarchate of Constantinople. There were 158 parishes in Estonia and 183 clerics in the Estonian church. There was also a Chair of Orthodoxy in the Faculty of Theology at the University of Tartu. There was a Pskovo-Pechorsky Monastery in Petseri, two convents—in Narva and Kuremäe, a priory in Tallinn and a seminary in Petseri. The ancient monastery in Petseri was preserved from the mass church destruction that occurred in Soviet Russia.

=== Soviet occupation ===
In 1940, Estonia was occupied by the Soviet Union, whose government undertook a general programme of the dissolution of all ecclesiastical independence within its territory. From 1942 to 1944, however, autonomy under Constantinople was temporarily revived. In 1945, a representative of the Moscow Patriarchate dismissed the members of the OCE synod who had remained in Estonia and established a new organisation, the Diocesan Council. Orthodox believers in the Estonian Soviet Socialist Republic were thus subordinated to being a diocese within the Russian Orthodox Church.

Soon after Nazi Germany attacked the Soviet Union, Metropolitan Alexander declared his break-up with Moscow and reunion with the Patriarchate of Constantinople. Bishop Paul of Narva remained loyal to the Moscow Patriarchate. During their occupation, the Germans didn't hamper Metropolitan Alexander to lead the life of his parishes and Bishop Paul to be in charge of the Russian diocese in Narva and many other parishes loyal to Russian Orthodox Church.

Not long before the Soviet Army entered Tallinn, Metropolitan Alexander left Estonia, the Synod of Estonian Apostolic Orthodox Church addressed Alexy (Simansky), Metropolitan of Leningrad and Novgorod, with a petition to resume the jurisdiction of the Moscow Patriarchate.

Just before the Soviet occupation in 1944 and the dissolution of the Estonian synod, the primate of the church, Metropolitan Aleksander, went into exile along with 21 clergymen and about 8,000 Orthodox believers. The Orthodox Church of Estonia in Exile with its synod in Sweden continued its activity according to the canonical statutes, until the restoration of Estonian independence in 1991. Before he died in 1953, Metr. Aleksander established his community as an exarchate under Constantinople. Most of the other bishops and clergy who remained behind were exiled to Siberia. In 1958, a synod was established in exile, and the church was organized from Sweden.

=== Estonian independence ===
Following the breakup of the Soviet Union, divisions within the Orthodox community in Estonia arose between those who wished to remain under Russian authority and those who wished to return to the jurisdiction of the Ecumenical Patriarchate, with the dispute often taking place along ethnic lines, many Russians having immigrated to Estonia during the Soviet occupation. Negotiations between the two patriarchates failed to produce any agreement.

In 1993, the synod of the Orthodox Church of Estonia in Exile was re-registered as the autonomous Orthodox Church of Estonia, and on February 20, 1996, Ecumenical Patriarch Bartholomew I renewed the tomos granted to the OCE in 1923, restoring its canonical subordination to the Ecumenical Patriarchate. This action brought immediate protest from the Estonian-born Patriarch Alexei II of the Moscow Patriarchate, which regarded his native Estonia as part of his canonical territory and the Patriarch of Moscow removed the name of the Ecumenical Patriarch from the diptychs in 1996 for several months (see 1996 Moscow–Constantinople schism).

An agreement was reached in which local congregations could choose which jurisdiction to follow. The Orthodox community in Estonia, which accounts for about 14% of the total population, remains divided, with the majority of faithful (mostly ethnic Russians) remaining under Moscow. A U.S. Department of State report from November 2003 said that about 20,000 believers (mostly ethnic Estonians) in 60 parishes are part of the autonomous church, with 150,000 faithful in 31 parishes, along with the monastic community of Pühtitsa, paying traditional allegiance to Moscow.

On 6 November 2000 Archbishop Cornelius became Metropolitan of Tallinn and All Estonia. On 19 April 2018 Metropolitan Cornelius reposed. In 2018 Archbishop Eugene (Reshetnikov) was elected Metropolitan of Tallinn and All Estonia. He began his role as the Primate of the Estonian Orthodox Church of the Moscow Patriarchate on 17 June 2018.

=== Road to self-government ===
In 2022 church officials condemned 2022 Russian invasion of Ukraine and speech of Patriarch Kirill of Moscow by 25 September 2022. In 2023 Estonia refused entry to the head of the church, Patriarch Kirill, whom Estonia had sanctioned over his support of the Russian invasion of Ukraine.

In January 2023 the church held a prayer service “for peace” with the pro-Russian political party Together.

On 18 January 2024 Estonia announced that it would not renew Reshetnikov's residence permit, stating "His actions are a security risk to Estonia." The Estonian Police said that he had been repeatedly asked to stop justifying Russia’s invasion of Ukraine and to stop defending the Russian government, but that he "has consistently vindicated and supported the Kremlin regime's bloody aggression against Ukraine." The lack of renewal required Reshetnikov to leave Estonia before the expiration of his residence permit on 6 February 2024. Reshetnikov left Estonia on the same day. He stated that he would continue working remotely when back in Russia. In May 2024, the Riigikogu (Parliament of Estonia) declared the Moscow Patriarchate an institution that "supports the military aggression of the Russian Federation."

On 20 August 2024, the church unilaterally declared its independence from the Moscow Patriarchate. In the application for the name change Archbishop Daniel stressed the local identity and church's commitment to operating in accordance with the laws of the Republic of Estonia. Next, in September 2024, the EOC-MP submitted a request to the Registration Department to amend the church's statutes and name to just "Estonian Orthodox Church", but a judge ruled the proposed new name "misleading because it incorrectly suggests that it encompasses all Orthodox Christians in Estonia". The EOC-MP suggested "Estonian Christian Orthodox Church" instead, yet the Registration Department (at this time seeing no other issues with the proposed statutory amendments) still regarded the name misleading for the same reason, upon which the church went to the Tartu County Court to challenge this objection.

On 24 March 2025, the Estonian Orthodox Church of the Moscow Patriarchate (ECO-MP) finally won its legal challenge to amend its statutes since September 2024, and changed its name to Estonian Christian Orthodox Church (ECOC). Bishop Daniel of Tallinn commented: "With [our] new name and statutes, our church emphasizes its self-governing status. Over the past year, we have had to endure hostile attitudes due to our canonical ties to the Moscow Patriarchate, which is also the origin of the name of our church. The new name and statutes reflect our independence in church-administrative, economic, educational and civil authority-related affairs." On 9 April 2025, the Riigikogu passed a bill banning ties of churches to the ROC. At the time, the ECOC rejected a merger with the Estonian Apostolic Orthodox Church (EAOC), which is under the jurisdiction of the Ecumenical Patriarchate, as it did not want to sever its canonical ties to the Russian Orthodox Church. This position contributed to the ECOC's loss in a separate legal challenge in mid-May 2025 at the Tallinn Administrative Court, which dismissed the church's complaint that it was entitled to receive financial support from the state just like other churches in Estonia, but which had been denied because of the ECOC's continuing legal ties to the Moscow Patriarchate, which the state considered a threat to national security. The Churches and Congregations Act was amended by the Riigikogu on 18 June 2025 after concerns were raised over its constitutionality; the ECOC welcomed the amendments, but expressed regret that some of the provisions it would have liked to see amended remained unchanged, and concerns on "interference in the internal life of religious associations". Primate Stephanos of Tallinn of the EAOC renewed his offer of a conciliatory alternative the ECOC: to create a vicariate in which the two churches would cooperate without merging, and without subordination, which would allow the ECOC to keep its canonical integrity even if it severed ties with the Moscow Patriarchate. Bishop Daniel had earlier commented on the EAOC's proposal, raising concerns that a vicariate would significantly lower the ECOC's status and make it dependent on the EAOC.

== See also ==
- Religion in Estonia
- Catholic Church in Estonia
- Eastern Orthodoxy in Estonia

== Sources ==
- Blackwell Dictionary of Eastern Christianity, pp. 183–4
- The Estonian Apostolic Orthodox Church by Ronald Roberson, a Roman Catholic priest and scholar
