= Cornelius Jakobs =

Estonian priest

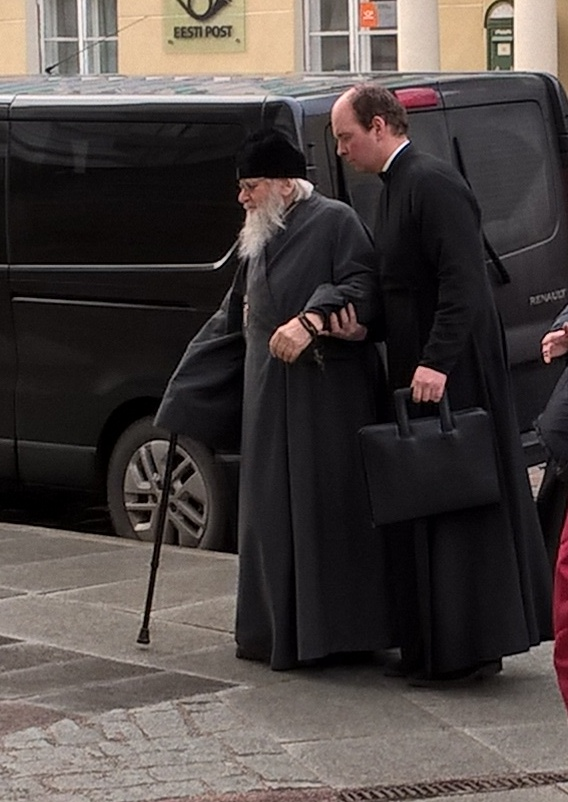
Metropolitan Cornelius, 2017

Metropolitan Cornelius (Russian: Митрополит Корнилий, Estonian: Metropoliit Kornelius or secular name Vjatšeslav Vassiljevitš Jakobs, or Vyacheslav Vasilyevich Yakobs, Russian: Вячеслав Васильевич Якобс; 19 June 1924 – 19 April 2018) was an Estonian metropolitan bishop of Tallinn and All Estonia, the head of the Estonian Orthodox Church of Moscow Patriarchate.

== Early life ==
Cornelius was born on 19 June 1924 in Tallinn into the family of a Russian army colonel. After the Russian Revolution in 1917, the family had emigrated to Estonia.

In 1943, he finished school and served as a psalm reader in the Church of our Lady Kazan in Tallinn. On 19 August 1945, he was ordained a deacon by Archbishop Paul (Dmitrovsky), and later, on 8 February 1948, he was ordained a priest by bishop Isidore (Bogoyavlensky). He was appointed rector of St Mary Magdalene Church in Haapsalu (et).

In 1951 he graduated from the Leningrad Theological Seminary (by correspondence). From 1951 to 1957 he belonged to the clergy of the Vologda diocese.

== Arrest and imprisonment ==
On 27 February 1957, he was arrested by the KGB and charged with "anti-Soviet agitation" (due to his possession of religious books and conversations with believers). On 16 May 1957, he was sentenced to 10 years imprisonment.

He served his sentence in the political camps of Mordovia (Dubravlag). On 12 September 1960, the Supreme Court of Mordovia reduced the sentence to five years, and then by the court's resolution he was released from custody ahead of time and put on probation. (He was rehabilitated on 14 October 1988).

In November 1960 he returned to Estonia and became rector at the church of St. John of Baptist (et) in Nõmme, Tallinn.

In 1974 he became a widower. He was subsequently awarded the mitre and was elected chairman of the parish council.

== Later ecclesiastic career ==
On 20 July 1990 at the first meeting of the Holy Synod, chaired by new elected Patriarch Alexius II, he was appointed Bishop of Tallinn, vicar to His Holiness the Patriarch. On 21 August 1990, he took monastic vows in the Monastery of the Dormition at Pechery near Pskov and obtained the name of Cornelius; on 6 September 1990 he was elevated to the rank of archimandrite. On 15 September 1990, he was ordained a bishop at the Cathedral of St. Alexander Nevsky in Tallinn. The chirotony (laying on of hands) was done by Alexei II with Metropolitan Tikhon (Tajakka) of Helsinki (Finnish Orthodox Church), Bishop Eugene (Zhdan) of Tambov and Michurinsk, Bishop Victor (Pyankov) of Podolsk, and Bishop Leo (Tserpitsky) of Novgorod and Staraya Russa.

In 1992 the Holy Synod granted autonomy to the Estonian Orthodox Church and bishop Cornelius became the head of the Estonian church, with the title of Bishop of Tallinn and all Estonia. On 25 February 1995 he was elevated to the rank of archbishop. On 6 November 2000, he was elevated to the rank of Metropolitan of Tallinn and all Estonia.

In 2007 he dismissed local education related protests as "useless" and called on Estonian Orthodox Christians (mostly people of Russian descent) to embrace Estonian culture.

He became the oldest bishop of the Russian Orthodox Church and celebrated his 90th birthday in 2014. For the occasion he released an autobiographical book.

== Awards and honours ==
- 1966 - Patriarchal deed
- 1971 - Order of St. Vladimir Grand Duke Wladimir III degree
- 1986 - Order of St. Sergius III level
- 1991 - Order of the Finnish Orthodox Church - comandor sign of Knighthood of the Holy Lamb (Pyhan Karitsan Ritarikunnan Komentajamerkki)
- 1996 - Order of the Holy Prince Daniel of Moscow, II degree
- 1999 - Order of St. Sergius II degree;
- 2002 - Order of St. Innocent, Metropolitan of Moscow, III degree;
- 2004 - Order of St. Equal to the Apostles Prince Vladimir II degree;
- 2007 - Order of St. Innocent, Metropolitan of Moscow, II degree
- 2009 - Order of the Holy Martyr Isidore of Yuriev I degree (Estonian Orthodox Church)
- Order of St. Prince Daniel of Moscow II degree;
- 2009 - Order of St. Sergius I degree
- 2014 - Order of St. Innocent of Moscow I degree
- 2014 - Order of St. Vladimir Equal-to-the-Apostles I degree
