= Internatsionalnoye, North Kazakhstan Region =

Internatsionalnoye Kazakh: Интернациональное Russian: Интернациональное
- Location in Kazakhstan
- Coordinates: 54°45′40″N 68°27′17″E
- Country: Kazakhstan
- Region: North Kazakhstan Region
- District: Mamlyut District

Population (1999)
  - Total: 96
- Time zone: UTC+6 (Asia/Almaty)

Internatsionalnoye (Kazakh: Интернациональное) is a former village and located in the Mamlyut District in North Kazakhstan Region of Kazakhstan. 96 (1999 census results). It was abolished in the 2000s.
