= Schism (disambiguation) =

A schism is a division between people, usually belonging to an organization, movement, or religious denomination.

Schism may also refer to:

== Religious ==
- List of schisms in Christianity
  - Meletian schism (4th century), a split involving the Patriarch of Antioch
  - Nestorian Schism (431), a split between the Church in the Sassanid Empire and the Church in the Eastern Roman Empire, after the First Council of Ephesus
  - Non-Chalcedonian Christianity (5th century), a split between the church in Armenia, Syria and Egypt and the church in Asia Minor, the Balkan peninsula and Italy
  - Acacian schism (484–519), a split between the Eastern and Western Christian churches
  - Schism of the Three Chapters (553–698), a split within the Roman Catholic Church
  - Photian schism (863–867), a split between Eastern and Western Christianity
  - East–West Schism, (11th century; 1054), a split between the Roman Catholic Church and the Eastern Orthodox Church; sometimes called The Great Schism
  - Western Schism (1378–1417), a split within the Roman Catholic Church
  - Schism of 1552 (1552), a split within the Church of the East
  - Protestant Reformation (16th century; starting 1517), a split between the Catholic Church and early Protestants
    - Anglican Schism or English Reformation (16th century), a split between the Catholic Church and England
  - Great Russian Schism (mid-17th century), a split between the Russian Orthodox Church and the Old Believers movement
  - Nonjuring schism (1688), a split within the Anglican Churches of England, Scotland and Ireland
  - Crotty Schism (early 19th century), two priests split from the Catholic Church in Ireland
  - Bulgarian schism (1872), a split between the Orthodox Church and the Bulgarian Church
  - Aglipayan schism, a group of Filipino nationalists split during the early 20th century
  - Montaner Schism (1967–1969), a Catholic parish split from its diocese in northern Italy who eventually joined the Eastern Orthodox Church
  - 1996 Moscow–Constantinople schism, the break of communion between the patriarchates of Moscow and Constantinople over the dispute concerning the canonical jurisdiction over Estonia
  - 2018 Moscow–Constantinople schism, the break of communion between the patriarchates of Moscow and Constantinople over the dispute concerning the canonical jurisdiction over Ukraine
- Muslim schism
  - Ahmadiyya schism (1914), a split of the Lahore Ahmadiyya Movement. Commonly known among the Ahmadis as just "The Split"
- Jewish schisms, splits along cultural as well as religious bases
- Baháʼí–Azali split (1866), a split between the Bábís and the Bahá'ís

== Political ==
- National Schism (1910–1922), a political crisis in Greece
- Internationalist–defencist schism (1914), a split within European Socialist parties
- Muslim League schisms, splits within the Muslim League of Indian and Pakistan

== Sports ==
- The Schism (1895), a split between rugby league and rugby union in England
- Australian rules football schism (1938–1949), a split between the Victorian Football League and the Victorian Football Association in Australia

== Arts and entertainment ==
- "Schisms" (Star Trek: The Next Generation), 1992 television episode
- Schism (novel), 2004 work by Catherine Asaro
- "Schism" (song), a 2001 song by American rock band Tool
- "Schism", a 1988 song by Anthrax, from State of Euphoria
- "Schism", a 1994 song from Kerbdog's eponymous debut album
- Schism Records, a hardcore record label and fanzine operated out of New York in the 1980s
- Schizm: Mysterious Journey, a computer game
- Schisma, a musical term defining a ratio
- "Schism", an enemy in the 2008 survival horror video game Silent Hill: Homecoming
- "X-Men: Schism", a 2011 X-Men storyline
- Schism, the original title for the 2013 film Fractured, by Adam Gierasch and Jace Anderson
- "Schism" (Arrow), an episode of Arrow
- Schism, a professional wrestling stable consisting of Joe Gacy, Rip Fowler and Jagger Reid

== See also ==
- Schismatic (disambiguation)
