= Internatsionalnoye, Jambyl Region =

Internatsionalnoye
- Village
- Location within Kazakhstan
- Coordinates: 42°54′11″N 73°14′39″E
- Country: Kazakhstan
- Region: Jambyl Region
- District: Merki District

Population (2009)
  - Total: 1,944
- Time zone: UTC+5 (UTC + 5)

Internatsionalnoye (Kazakh: Интернациональное; Russian: Интернациональное) is a village in southern Kazakhstan. It is located in the Merki District in Jambyl Region. Population: 1,944 (2009 census results);1,485 (1999 census results).
