= Alexander Nevsky Cathedral, Tallinn =

Church building in Tallinn, Estonia

Coordinates: 59°26′09.0″N 24°44′21.7″E

- Alexander Nevsky Cathedral, Tallinn.
- Alexander Nevsky Cathedral, Tallinn
- Location: Tallinn
- Country: Estonia
- Denomination: Eastern Orthodox Church

History
- Consecrated: 1900

Administration
- Metropolis: Estonian Orthodox Church of the Moscow Patriarchate

Clergy
- Bishop: Metropolitan Eugene

The Alexander Nevsky Cathedral of Tallinn (Note: Estonian: Tallinna Neeva Vaga Õigeusulise Suurvürsti Aleksandri peakirik, Russian: Александро-Невский собор) is an Eastern Orthodox cathedral in central Tallinn, Estonia. It was built in 1894–1900, when the country was part of the former Russian Empire. The cathedral is the city's largest cupola church. The late Patriarch Alexy II of Moscow (1929–2008) started his priestly ministry in the cathedral. It is the primary cathedral of the semi-autonomous Estonian Orthodox Church of the Moscow Patriarchate.

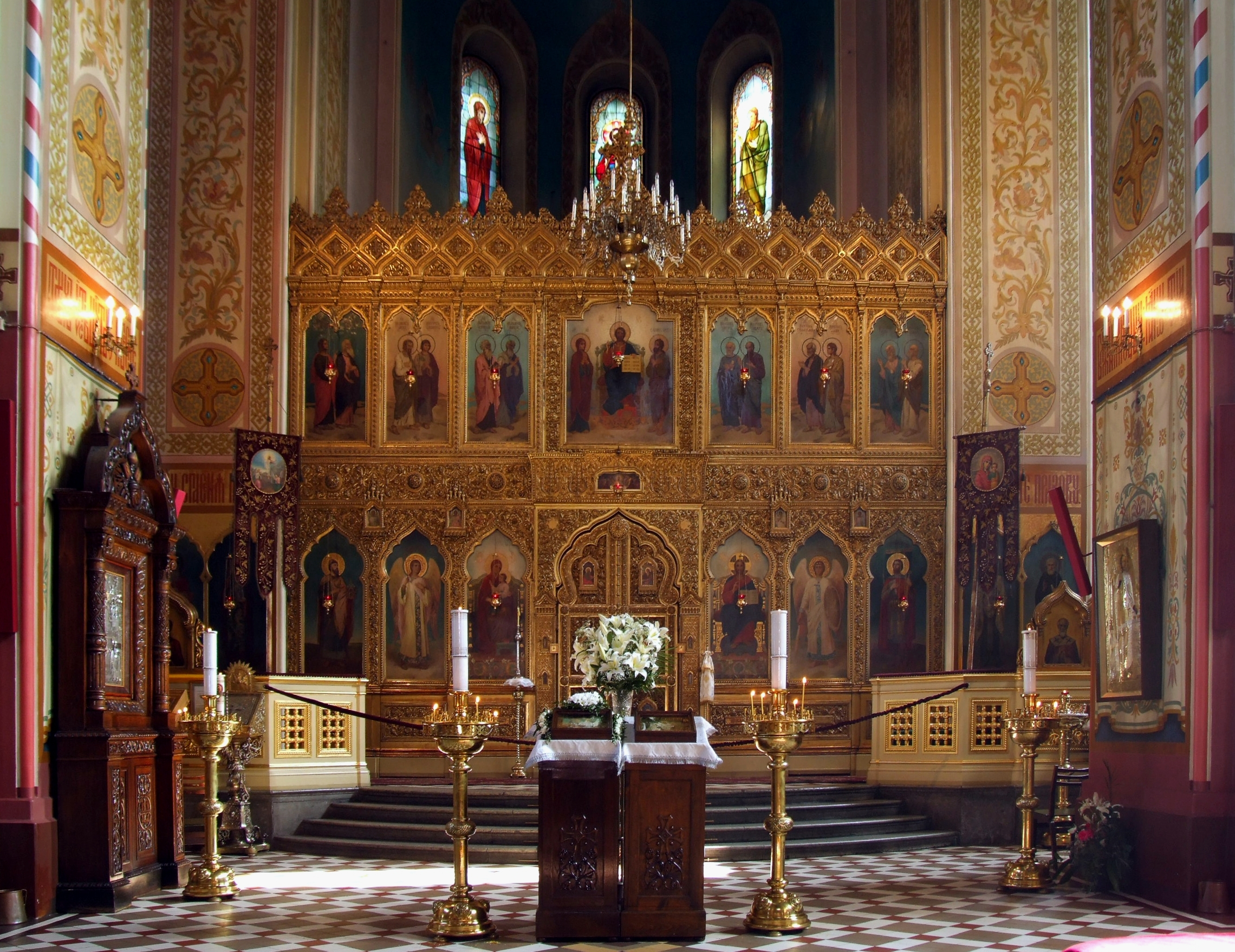
Interior of the cathedral

== History ==
The cathedral was built onto the Toompea hill in central Tallinn to a design by architect Mikhail Preobrazhensky in a typical Russian Revival style in 1894–1900. The church is dedicated to the grand prince of Kiev, and later Russian orthodox saint, Alexander Nevsky.

The cathedral is richly decorated and has eleven bells cast in Saint Petersburg, the largest of which weighs about 16 tons, more than the other ten combined. It has three altars, with the northern altar dedicated to Vladimir I and the southern to St. Sergius of Radonezh.

The base of the building is Finnish granite. In the five onion domes, gilded iron crosses are seen. Inside are three gilded, carved wooden iconostases, along with four icon boxes. The icons of the iconostasis and icon boxes were painted in Saint Petersburg on copper and zinc plates. The windows are decorated with stained glass.

The cathedral was built during the period of late 19th century Russification and has been disliked by many Estonians as a symbol of former Russian oppression.

During the 1944–1991 Soviet occupation of Estonia, as the Soviet regime was officially non-religious, many churches including the cathedral were left to fall into disrepair. The building and its interior have been meticulously restored since Estonia regained full independence in 1991.

== Demolition Plans ==
After Estonia had become an independent country, the parliament and government, by the popular demand, had to discuss and consider removing the cathedral on multiple occasions in the 1920s and 1930s, however no final decision on the demolition of the building was ever made.

In 1924 Estonian architect Karl Burman proposed to demolish Cathedral or rebuild it to the Pantheon of Estonian Independence. The demolition was planned for 1 May 1929 but was cancelled.

Since 2022, the issue of demolishing or relocating the Cathedral has been revived in response to Russia's aggression against Ukraine - initially on social media and blogs - among others, Mario Kadastik, member of Estonian parliament from ruling Estonian Reform Party proposed to create a park in its place. - and later in media publications.

== Gallery ==
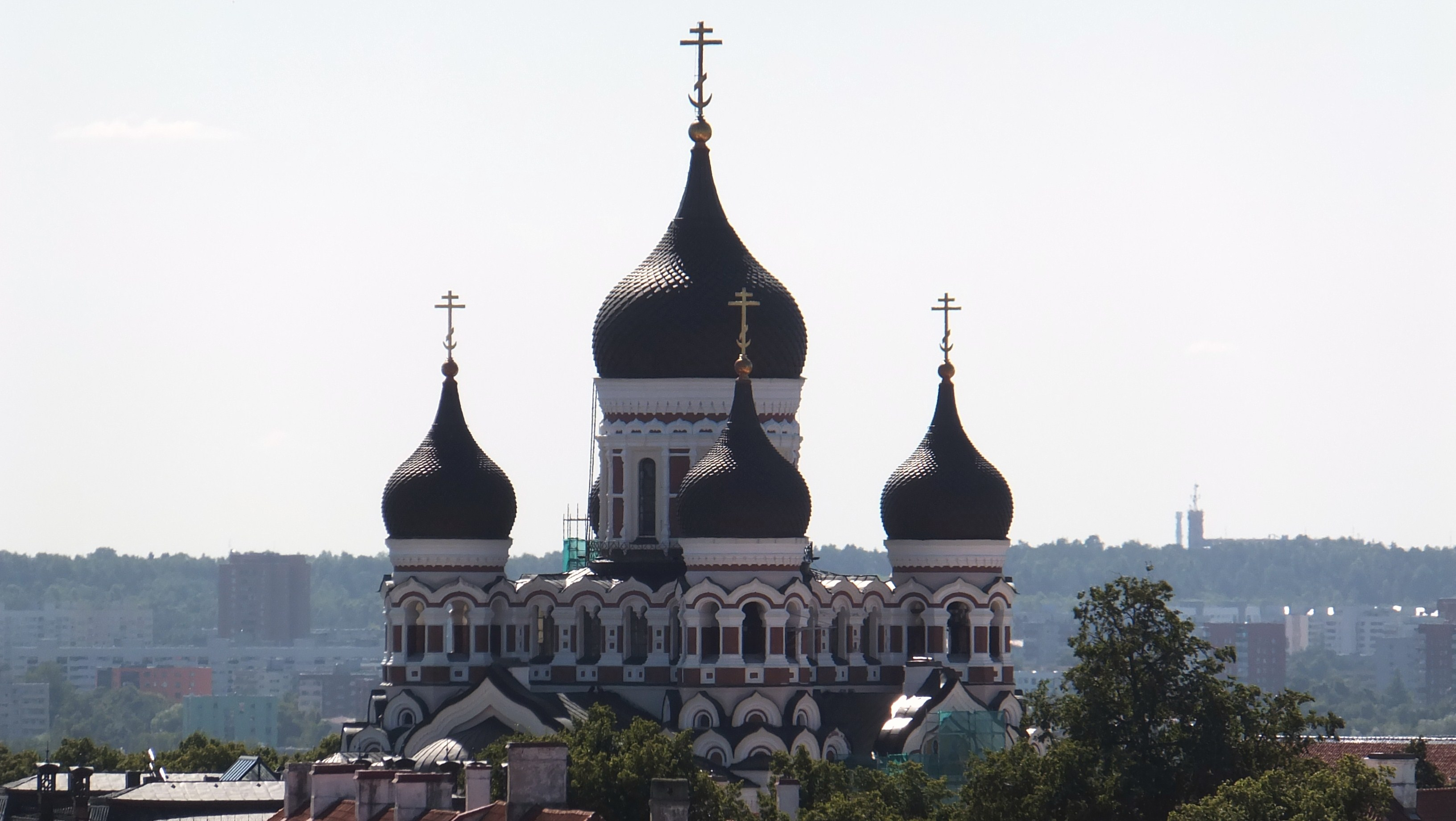
View from the top viewing platform of St. Olaf's Church

The cathedral domes

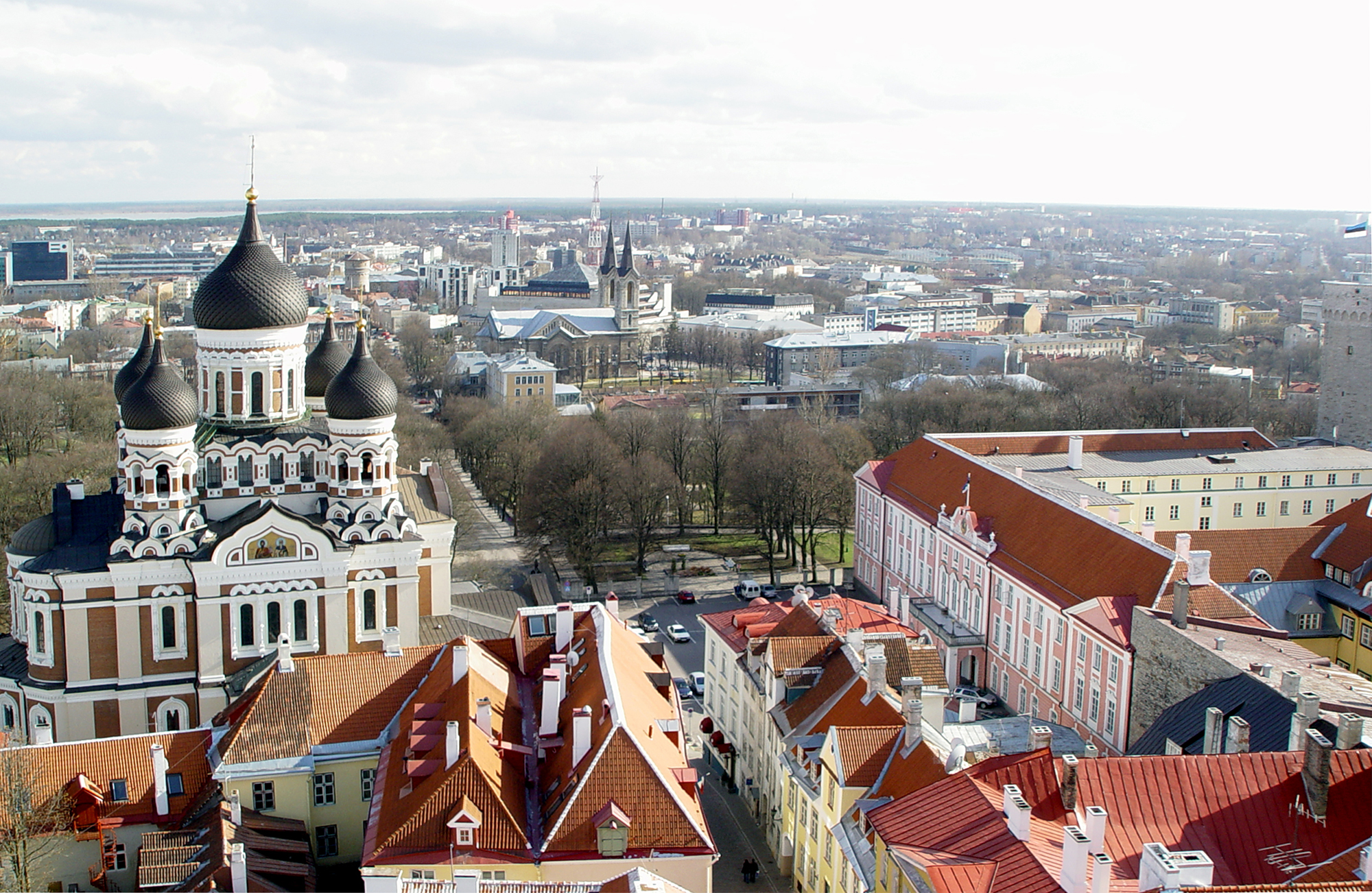
Alexander Nevsky Cathedral and Toompea Castle

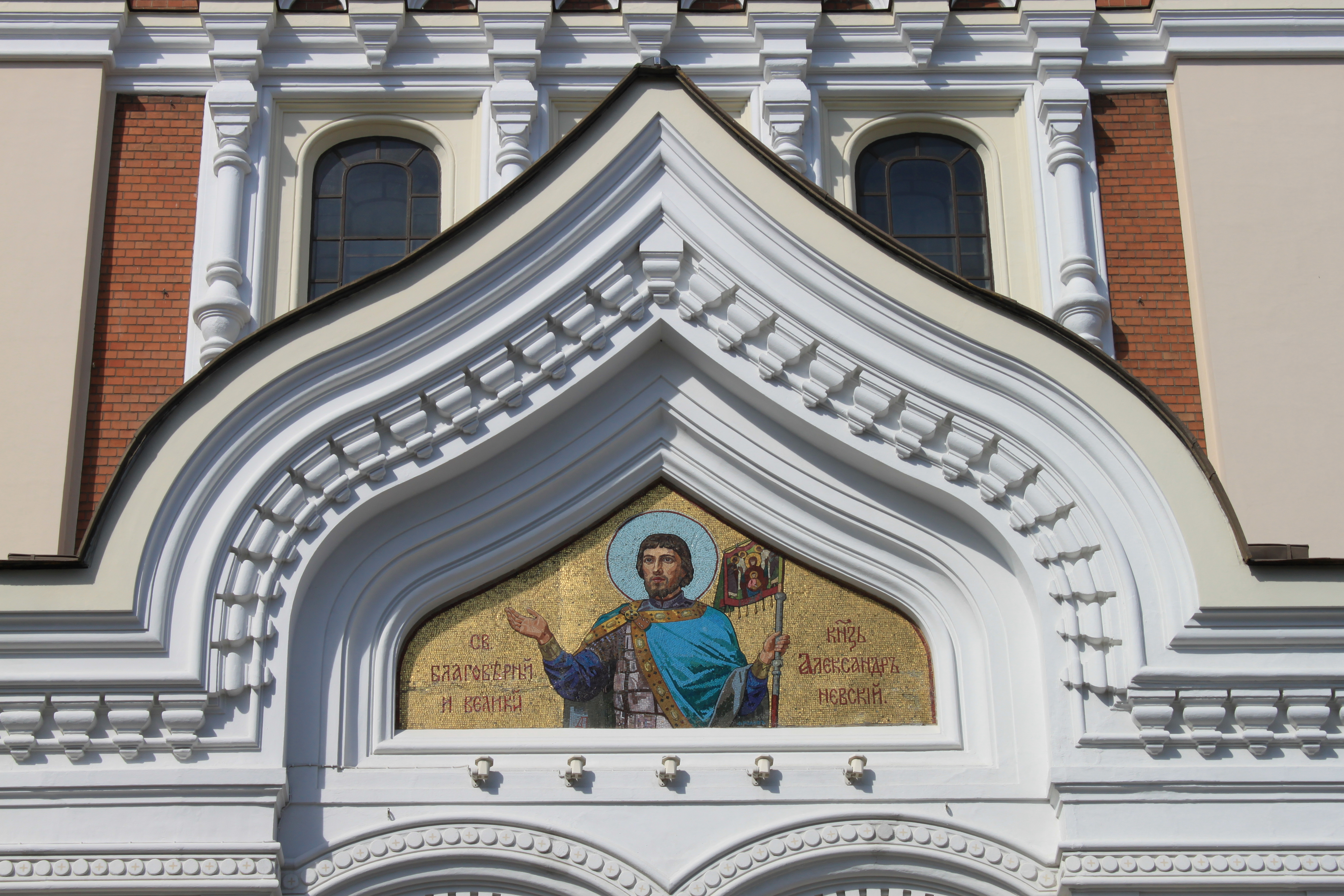
A mosaic for Alexander Nevsky

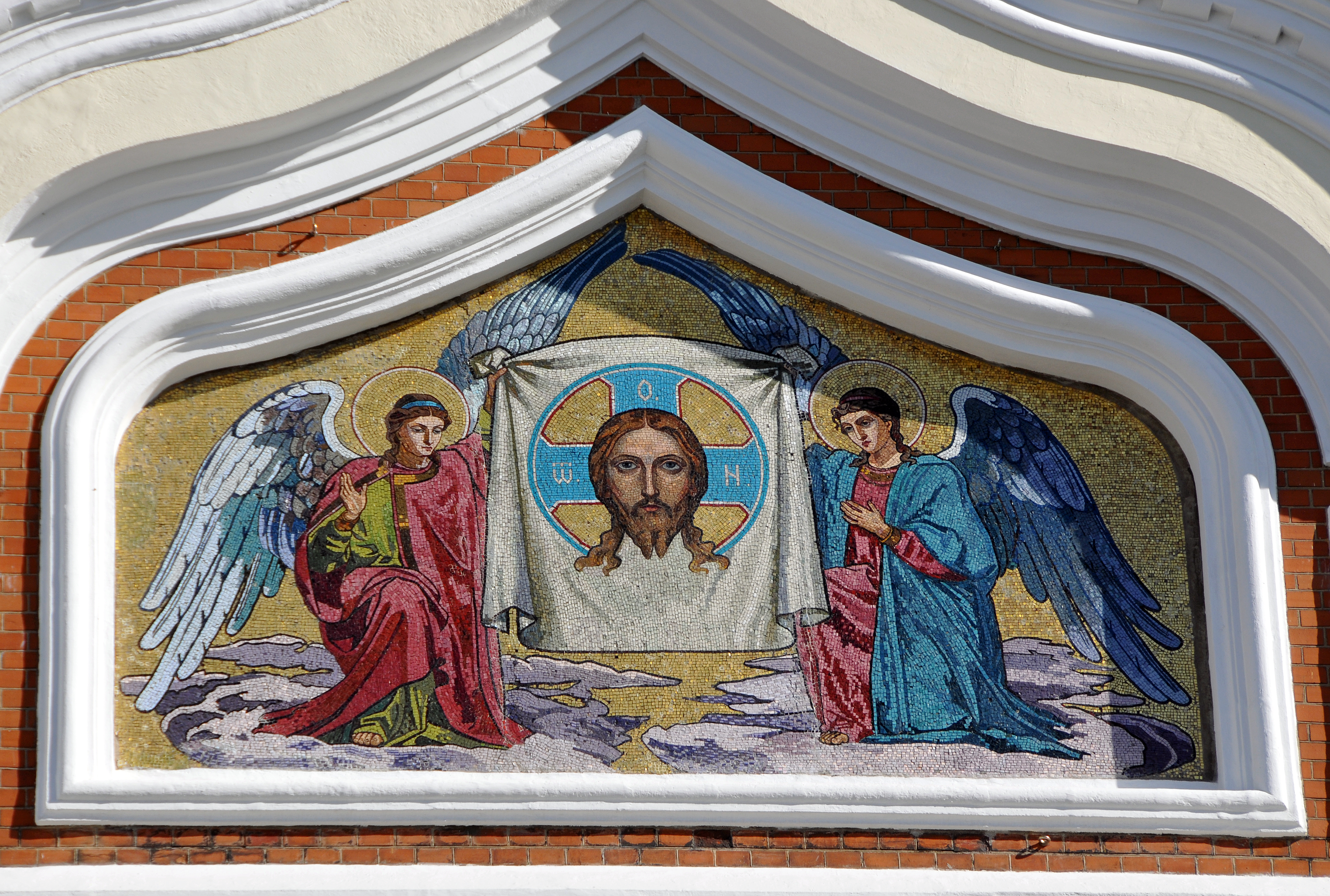
Image of Edessa

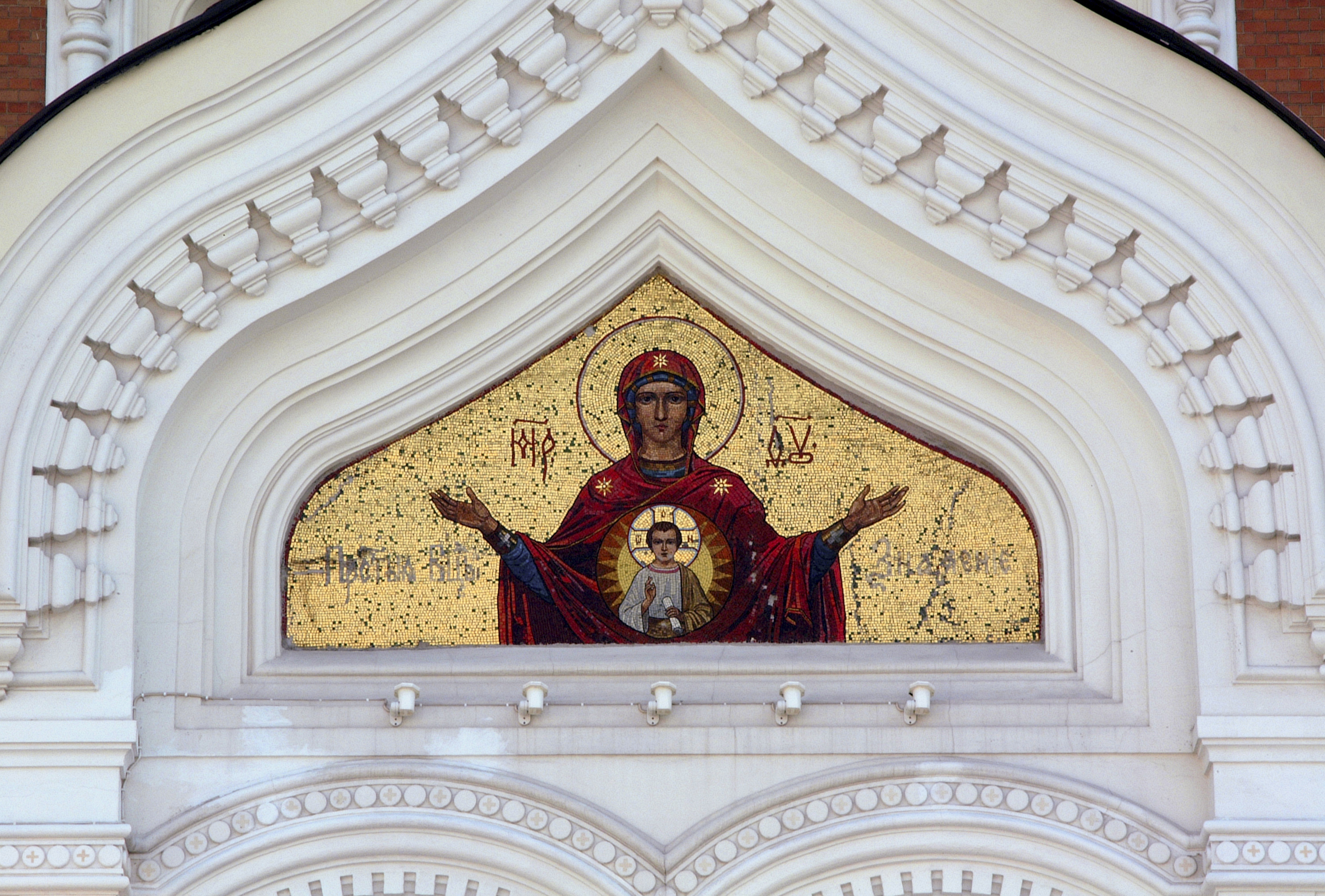
Our Lady of the Sign

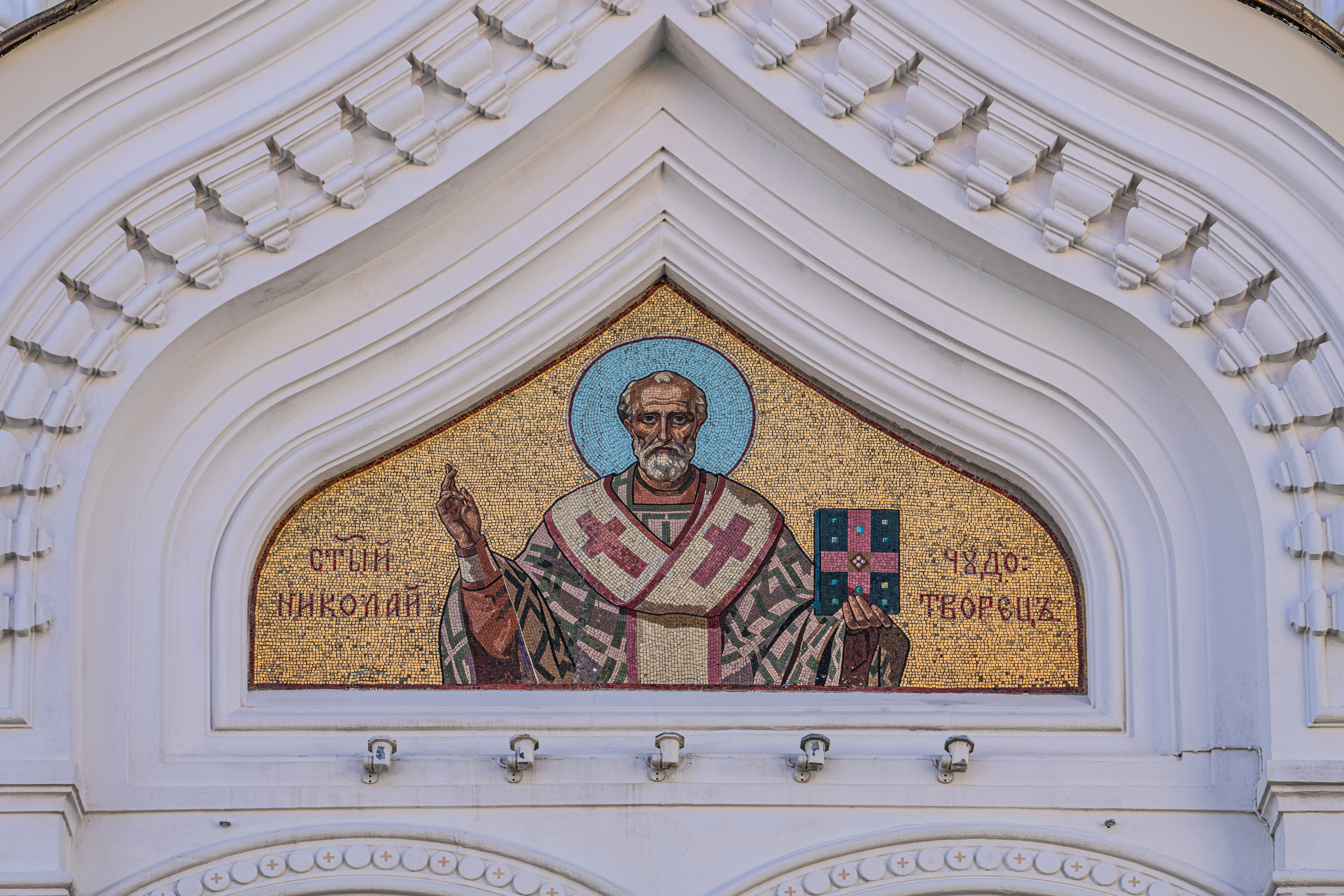
St. Nicholas

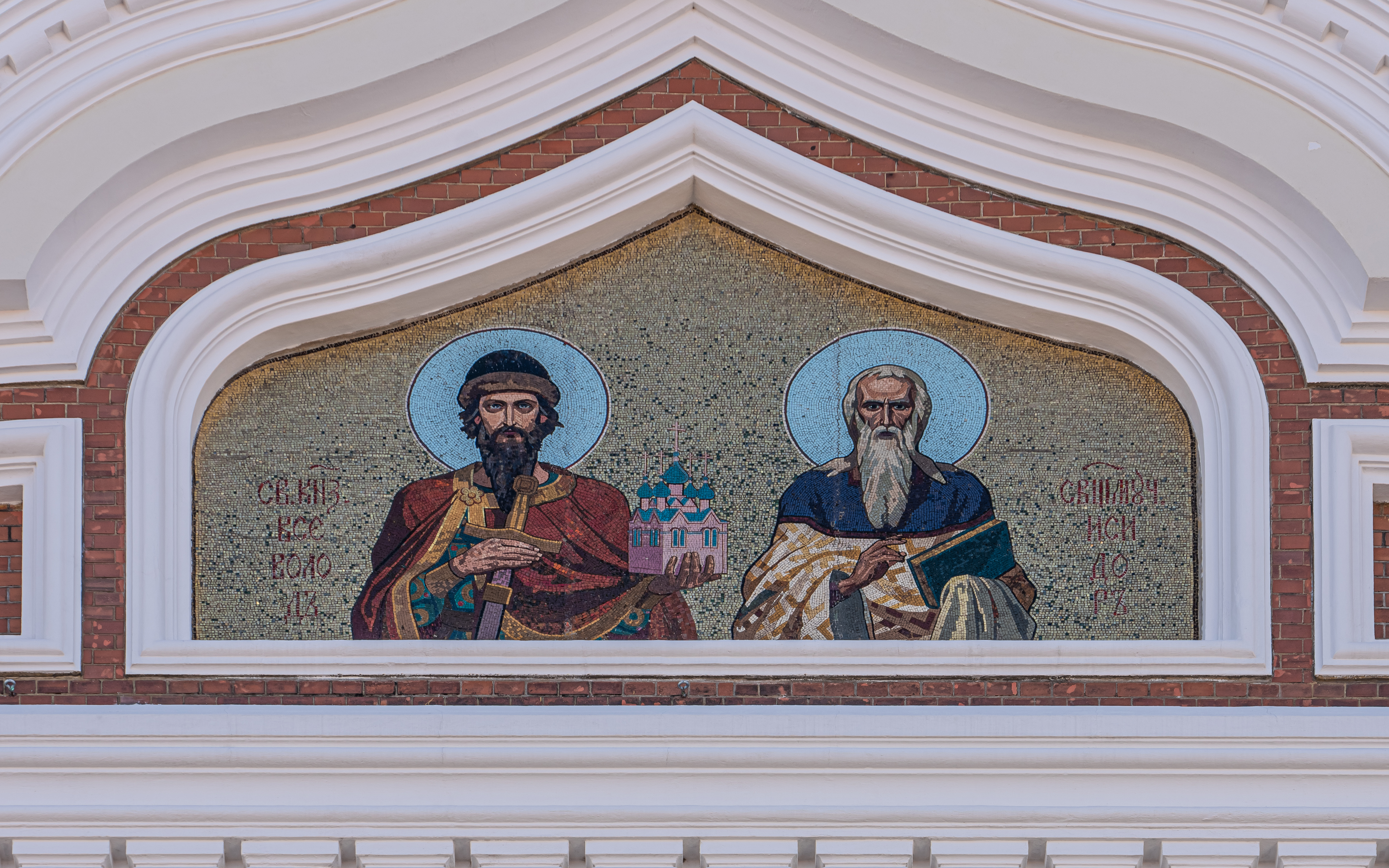
Vsevolod I Yaroslavich and Isidore of Kyiv

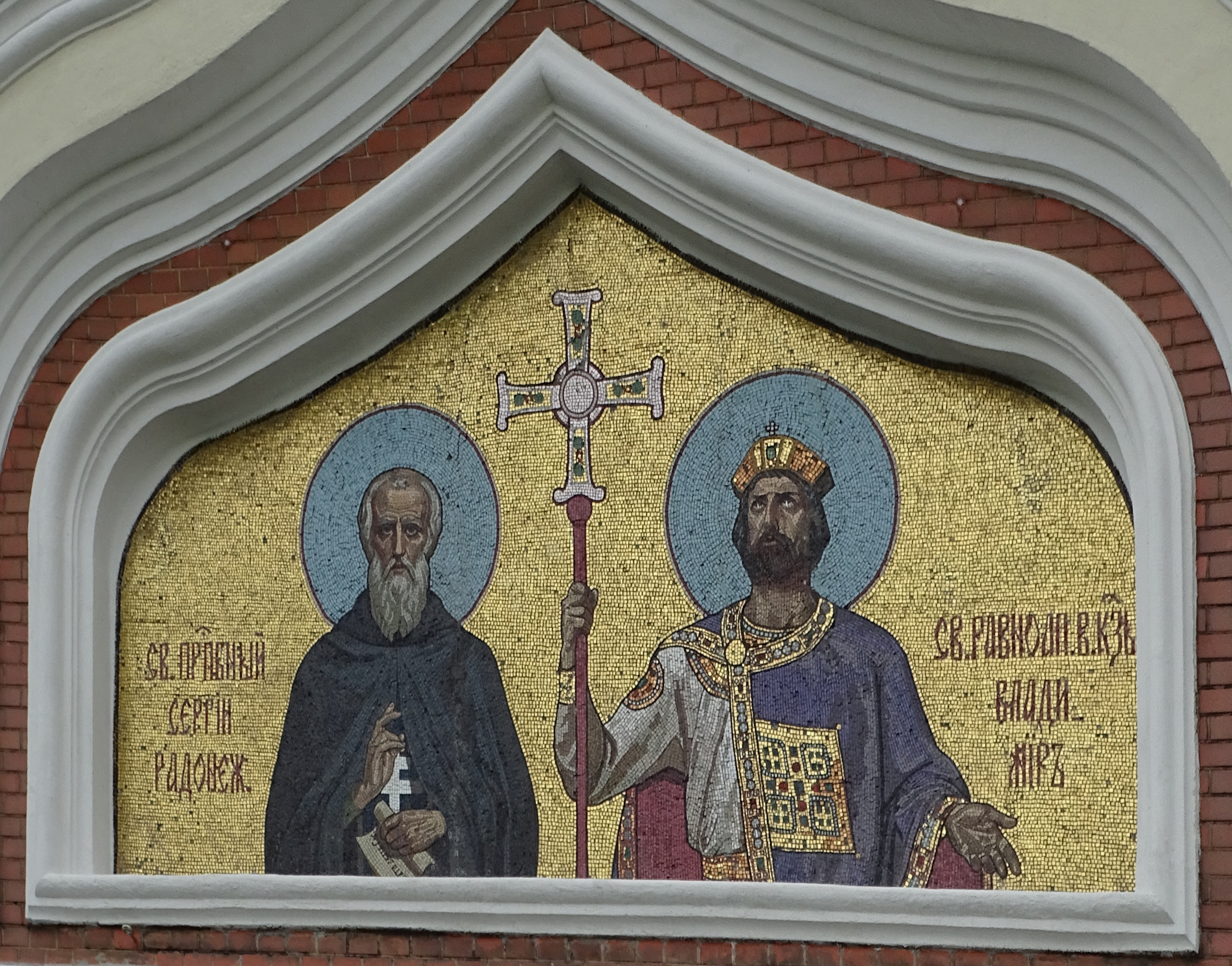
Sergius of Radonezh and Vladimir the Great

== See also ==
- List of cathedrals in Estonia
- Alexander Nevsky Cathedral, Warsaw, demolished after the restoration of Polish independence.
- St. Panteleimon's Cathedral
- List of largest Eastern Orthodox church buildings
