= 1996 Moscow–Constantinople schism =

Schism between orthodox churches

- Date: 23 February 1996 – 16 May 1996
- Type: Christian schism
- Cause: Decision of the Ecumenical Patriarchate to reestablish the Estonian Apostolic Orthodox Church as their autonomous church
- Participants: Main: Ecumenical Patriarchate, Russian Orthodox Church Minor: Estonian Apostolic Orthodox Church, Estonian Orthodox Church of the Moscow Patriarchate
- Outcome: 1. The Russian Orthodox Church severed full communion with the Ecumenical Patriarchate for less than three months 2. Still tensions between the EAOC and the EOCMP after the schism ended

Monogram of the Patriarch of Moscow and all Russia Alexy II

Emblem of the Ecumenical Patriarch of Constantinople Bartholomew I

In 1996, a schism between Moscow and Constantinople occurred; this schism began on 23 February 1996, when the Russian Orthodox Church severed full communion with the Ecumenical Patriarchate of Constantinople, and ended on 16 May 1996 when the Russian Orthodox Church and the Ecumenical Patriarchate reached an agreement.

This excommunication by the Russian Orthodox Church was done in response to a decision of the synod of the Ecumenical Patriarchate to reestablish an Orthodox church in Estonia under the Ecumenical Patriarchate's canonical jurisdiction as an autonomous church on 20 February 1996. This schism has similarities with the Moscow–Constantinople schism of October 2018.

On 8 November 2000, in an official statement, the Russian Orthodox Church described this schism as "the tragic situation of February–May 1996, when, because of the schismatic actions of the Patriarchate of Constantinople in Estonia, Orthodox Christians of the Churches of Constantinople and Russia, who live all over the world in close spiritual contact, were deprived of common Eucharistic communion at the one Chalice of Christ."

== Brief background ==
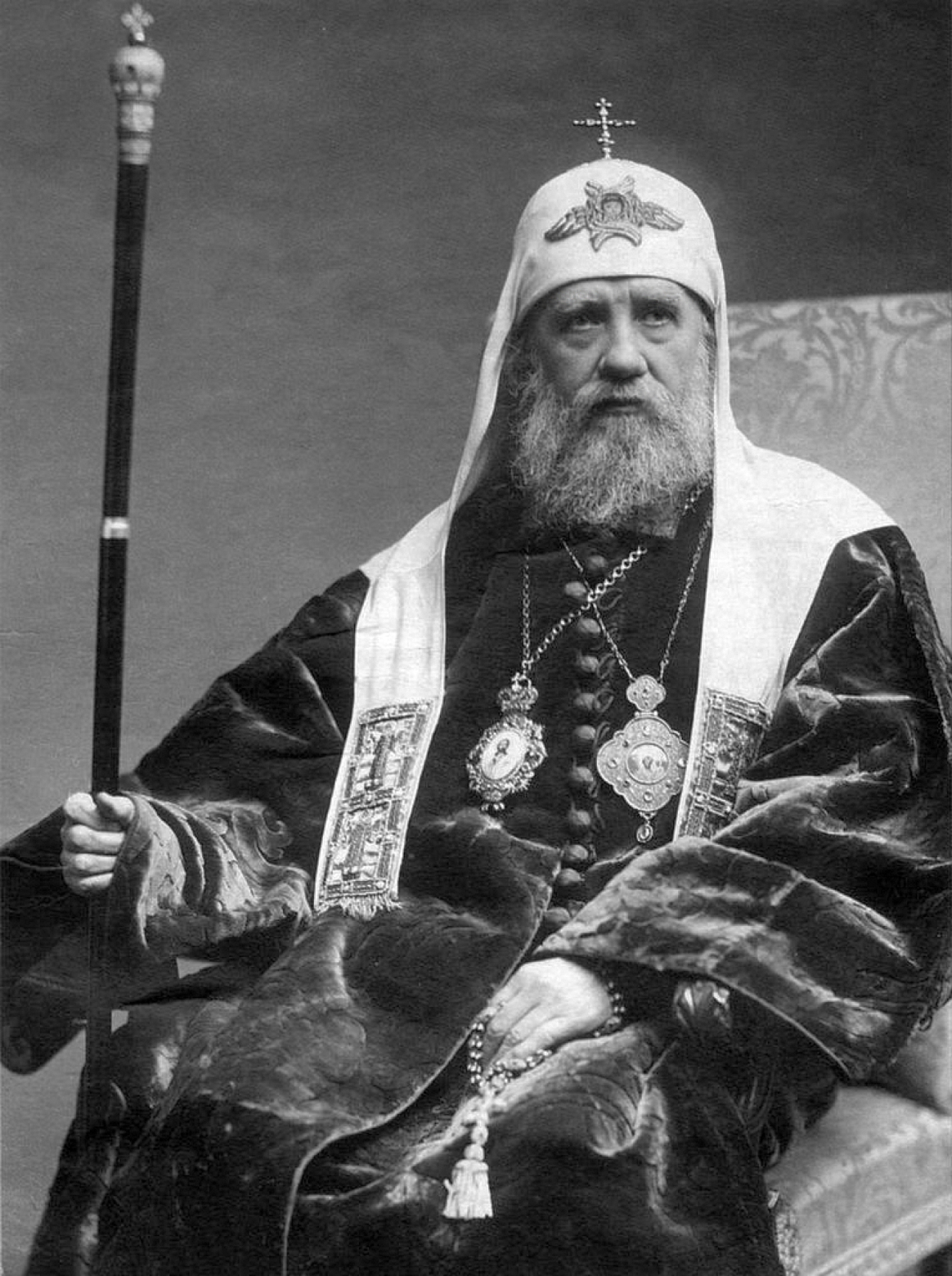
Patriarch Tikhon of Moscow

=== Autonomy of the Estonian Apostolic Orthodox Church ===
Patriarch of the Russian Orthodox Church, St. Tikhon, recognised in 1920 the Estonian Apostolic Orthodox Church (EAOC) as being autonomous (Resolution No. 1780) under the jurisdiction of the Moscow Patriarchate, postponing the discussion concerning the EAOC's autocephaly. "After Patriarch Tikhon's arrest by the Soviet government, contacts between him and the autonomous Estonian Orthodox Church were severed. Consequently, the autonomous Estonian Orthodox Church, which wanted to assert its ecclesiastical independence, decided to seek a fuller and final canonical recognition from the patriarch of Constantinople."

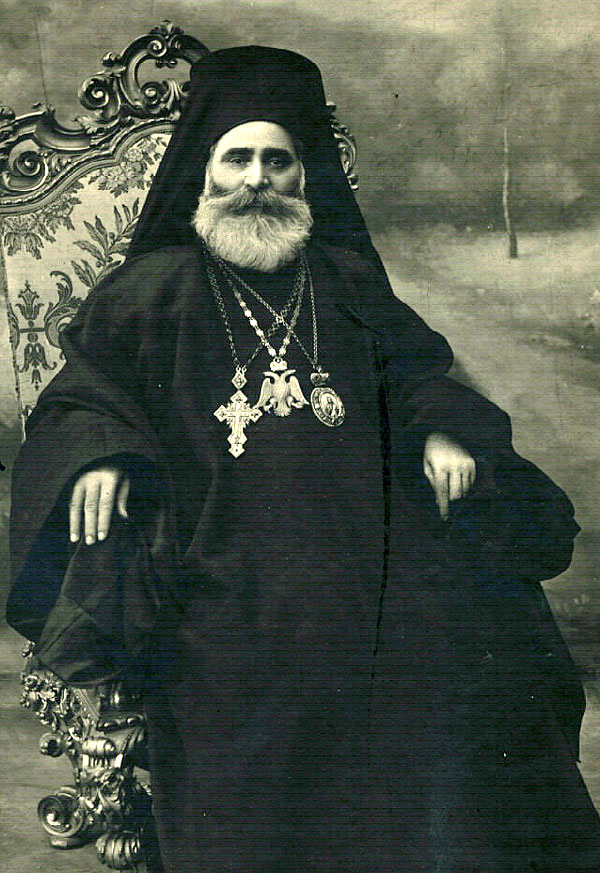
Patriarch Meletius IV of Constantinople (1923)

=== Ecumenical Patriarchate's tomos of 1923 ===
With the Estonian independence and the persecution of the Russian Orthodox Church, Metropolitan Aleksander Paulus of Tallinn and all Estonia asked the Ecumenical Patriarchate to receive his church (the Estonian Apostolic Orthodox Church (EAOC)) into the jurisdiction of the Ecumenical Patriarchate. On 7 July 1923, Patriarch Meletios IV of Constantinople issued a tomos accepting the Estonian Church in the Ecumenical Patriarchate's jurisdiction with an autonomous status (Tomos 3348). This tomos "established under the Ecumenical Patriarchate the Autonomous Orthodox Apostolic Church of Estonia known as "Orthodox Metropolitanate of Estonia"" Some Orthodox Russians in Estonia decided to remain under the jurisdiction of the Moscow Patriarchate. The Russian Orthodox Church considers that "Patriarch Meletius IV of Constantinople took advantage of the difficult situation of the Orthodox Church in Russia and illegally proclaimed jurisdiction of the Patriarchate of Constantinople on the territory of the independent Estonia and transformed the Estonian Autonomous Orthodox Church into the Estonian Metropolia of the Patriarchate of Constantinople." After a conflict with Constantinople, the Estonian Autonomous Orthodox Church got the legal property of national churches and monasteries.

=== Exile of the Orthodox Metropolitanate of Estonia and 1978 deactivation of the tomos ===
Flag of the Estonian Soviet Socialist Republic

In 1940 the Soviet Union annexed Estonia. After 1944, Metropolitan Aleksander Paulus of the EAOC went into exile in Stockholm, Sweden, with 23 members of his clergy and 7000 (or 8000) faithfuls. The church based in Stockholm remained attached to the Ecumenical Patriarchate and served around 10,000 Estonian Orthodox exiled in various countries. After the death of Metropolitan Alexander in 1953, the Ecumenical Patriarchate consecrated a new Estonian Orthodox bishop, bishop George (Välbe), to oversee the Estonian Church based in Stockholm. After Välbe's death in 1961, his Estonian parishes were placed under local bishops of the Ecumenical Patriarchate.

The Orthodox Church which remained in Estonia was incorporated into the Russian Orthodox Church after the Soviet annexed Estonia. On 10 December 1944, the synod of the Moscow Patriarchate promulgated the Ukase which ended the functioning of the Orthodox Church of Estonia and established in its place the Diocese of Tallinn and Estonia. This dissolution effectively took place on 9 March 1945. The Estonian Apostolic Orthodox Church later declared it considered that "[t]he autonomy of the Orthodox Church of Estonia, accorded in 1923 by the Oecumenical Patriarch Meletios, was abolished on March 9, 1945 by force, unilaterally without respecting the canonical order and without informing the Oecumenical Patriarch about it nor waiting for his consentment".

In a letter sent to the then-Patriarch of Moscow Alexy II on 24 February 1996, Ecumenical Patriarch Bartholomew wrote that "the Patriarchate of Russia during those years trespassed in countries under the spiritual jurisdiction of the Ecumenical Patriarchate, namely, Estonia, Hungary and elsewhere, always by the power of the Soviet army. The Church of Russia did not at the time seek the opinion of the Ecumenical Patriarchate, nor was any respect shown it. The annexation of the Orthodox Church of Estonia into the Most Holy Church of Russia happened arbitrarily and uncanonically. And it is certain that events which are uncanonical at one particular time are never blessed, never seen as efficacious, and never would they set a precedence."

On 13 April 1978, at the request of the Russian Orthodox Church, the Ecumenical Patriarchate deactivated the 1923 tomos which had established the autonomous Estonian Apostolic Orthodox Church under the Ecumenical Patriarchate. The Ecumenical Patriarch Bartholomew explained in 1996 it was "[d]ue to the then existing political conditions and following the persistent request of the Patriarch of Moscow" and "due to the circumstances of the times" as well as "for the sake of smooth relations with the Patriarchate of Moscow, at which time Estonia still constituted a section of the then Soviet Union" The Ecumenical Patriarch declared the tomos had been made "inoperative, but not invalid". "Due to demographic shifts, Russians made up the majority of the Orthodox population of Estonia by the end of Soviet rule."

=== Post-Soviet period ===
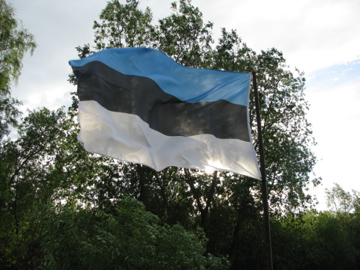
Estonian flag after the fall of the communist regime in Estonia

After the fall of the Soviet Union and the renewed independence of Estonia in 1991, a dispute developed among the Orthodox community between those who wished to remain linked to the Moscow Patriarchate and those who wanted the autonomous Orthodox church under the Ecumenical Patriarchate to be reestablished. Lengthy negotiations between the Russian Orthodox Church and the Ecumenical Patriarchate failed to produce an agreement.

"In 1991, after Estonia had broken away from the Soviet Union, the sovereignty of the Republic of Estonia was restored. At the time, the ruling Bishop in Estonia was Cornelius (Jakobs). He held negotiations with the Government concerning a number of urgent internal ecclesiastical matters, which could not be resolved without state support. On 11 August 1993, instead of registering the representatives of the Russian Orthodox Synod, the Estonian State Department of Religions registered the representatives of the «Synod of the Estonian Orthodox Church in Exile» as the sole legal successor of the Autonomous Estonian Apostolic Church. That registration was of political and social importance because it made the «Synod of the Estonian Orthodox Church in Exile» the sole owner of all church-related immovable property in Estonia. The Russian Orthodox Church started legal proceedings to defend its legal and canonical position in the country, that the «Synod in Exile» had neither an episcopal structure nor an administrative office in Estonia, as required by Estonian law. In 1994, another unexpected event came to be added to the above. A petition signed by the representatives of 54 out of the 83 Orthodox parishes in Estonia formally requested to join the jurisdiction of the Ecumenical Patriarchate. The 54 parishes represented the majority of the Orthodox believers in the country, and included both Estonian-speaking and Russian-speaking communities. A year later, a series of negotiations between the Ecumenical Patriarchate and the Russian Orthodox Patriarchate failed to reach a solution." "On 25 May 1995 Patriarch Bartholomew of Constantinople, while in Finland, made a broadcast appeal to the Orthodox believers in Estonia, in which he called them to 'revive as soon as possible the Estonian Autonomous Orthodox Church in direct communion with the Ecumenical Patriarchate'."

"On 3 January 1996, a delegation of the Russian Orthodox Church visited the Ecumenical Patriarchate in Istanbul for bilateral negotiations about the division among the Orthodox in Estonia. No agreement was reached, but the two sides agreed upon the continuation of the negotiations in Moscow on 2 February of the same year."

"On 4 January 1996, the Ecumenical Patriarch sent a pastoral letter «to the Orthodox communities in Estonia», in which he expressed his desire to «reactivate» the Autonomous Estonian Apostolic Church on the basis of the Tome (or decision) of the Ecumenical Patriarch in 1923. The letter expressed the hope to unite all in one church with a distinct diocese for the Russian-speaking parishes. On 16 January 1996, a delegation from the Ecumenical Patriarchate, including one Finnish Orthodox bishop and one priest, visited Estonia in an attempt to reach a viable solution. They met with representatives of the Moscow Patriarchate and the Estonian State authorities, including Prime Minister Tiit Vähi and the President Lennart Meri. After the meeting, statements were issued that the Ecumenical Patriarchate would accept Estonian Orthodox believers under its jurisdiction, but that it would also accept the division of the Orthodox community in Estonia into two parts and their belonging to two jurisdictions."

== History of the schism ==
=== 20 February 1996 decision of the Ecumenical Patriarchate ===
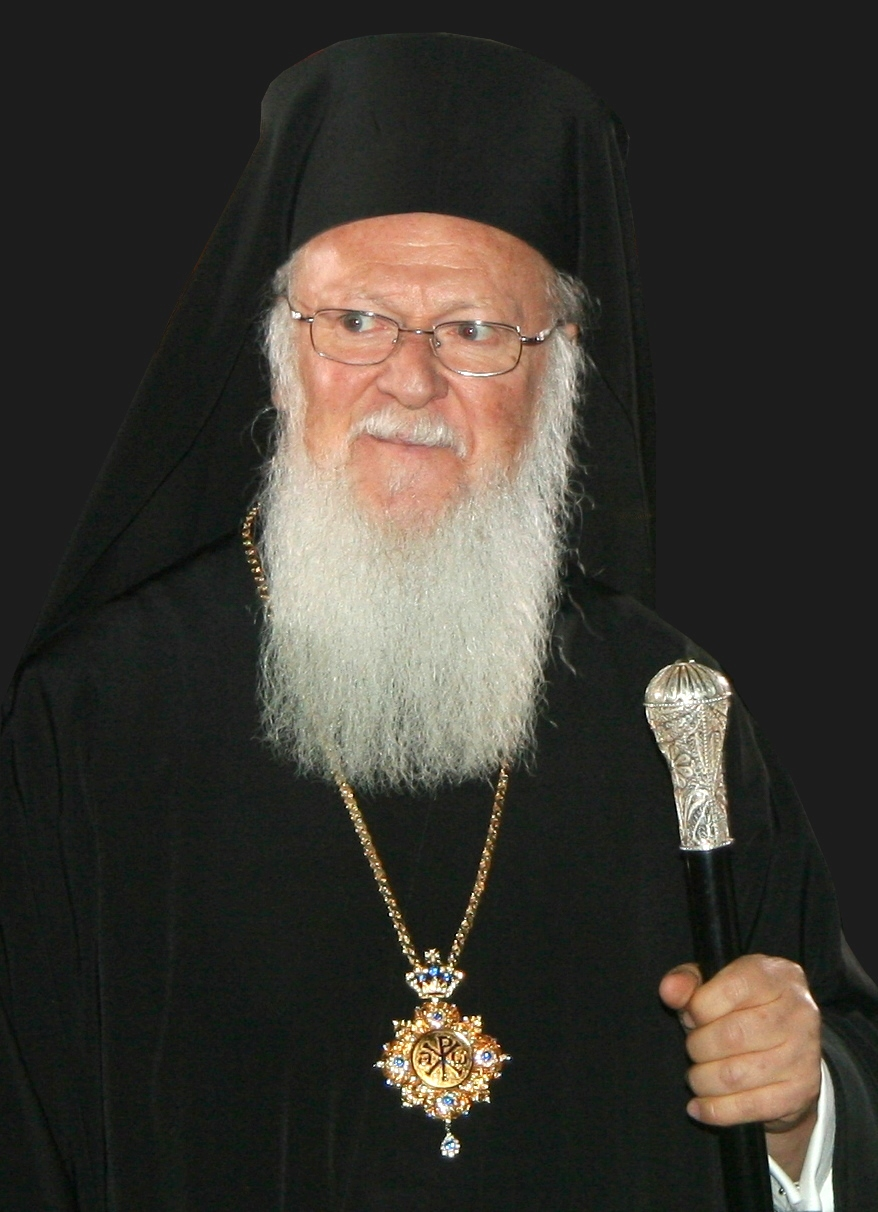
Ecumenical Patriarch Bartholomew I

On 20 February 1996, saying it was "following the persistent request of the Estonian Government and the overwhelming majority of the Estonian Orthodox parishes, which requested they be placed again under the aegis of the Ecumenical Patriarchate," the Ecumenical Patriarchate decided to reestablish an Orthodox church in Estonia under the Ecumenical Patriarchate's canonical jurisdiction as an autonomous church by reactivating the tomos of 1923 which had been issued by Ecumenical Patriarch Meletios IV.

On 22 February 1996, the Ecumenical Patriarchate officially announced its decision to reactivate the tomos of 1923 and to re-establish the Autonomous Estonian Apostolic Church. This was done on the basis of the EAOC's continued existence in exile in Sweden.

On 24 February 1996, a delegation of the Ecumenical Patriarchate, led by Metropolitan Joachim of Chalcedon, concelebrated the Divine Liturgy with Estonian clergy and in the presence of Archbishop John of Finland at the Church of the Transfiguration of Our Lord in Tallinn. That act marked the reactivation of the Autonomous Estonian Apostolic Church. On the same day, the Chief Secretariat of the synod of the Ecumenical Patriarchate issued an official communiqué. In that communiqué, it was announced that Archbishop John of Karelia, primate of the Finnish Orthodox Church, had been assigned as locum tenens of the Autonomous Estonian Apostolic Church.

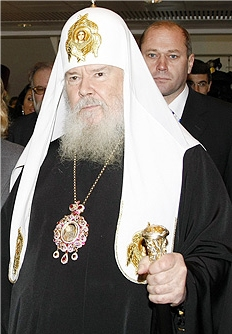
Patriarch of Moscow Alexy II (1929–2008)

=== Excommunication of the Ecumenical Patriarchate by the Russian Orthodox Church ===
On 23 February 1996, the Russian Orthodox Church decided to declare the Ecumenical Patriarch and the Estonian Apostolic Orthodox Church "as schismatic", "to suspend canonical and Eucharistic communion with the Patriarchate of Constantinople... and to omit the name of the Patriarch of Constantinople in the diptych of the Primates of the Local Orthodox Churches".

The next day, on 24 February, to justify the Ecumenical Patriarchate's decision taken on 20 February 1996, the Ecumenical Patriarchate issued a communiqué, and the Ecumenical Patriarch Bartholomew sent a letter to the then-Patriarch of Moscow Alexy II.

=== Negotiations between the Ecumenical Patriarchate and the Russian Orthodox Church ===
On 3 and 22 April in 1996, the Joint Commission of the Patriarchates of Constantinople and Moscow met in Zurich to discuss the situation. On 4 March, head of the DECR, Metropolitan Kirill, said the transfer of the EAOC under the jurisdiction of the Ecumenical Patriarchate was "canonically illegal" and that the ROC was ready to negotiate with the Ecumenical Patriarchate on the issue.

=== Agreement and resolutions ===
On 16 May 1996, an agreement was reached and the communion between the Russian Orthodox Church and the Ecumenical Patriarchate was restored.

Both parties agreed:

1. "to let the Orthodox Christians in Estonia freely decide to which church jurisdiction they wish to belong" 2. "[That] the Patriarchate of Constantinople [would] agre[e] to suspend for 4 months its decision of 20 February 1996 to establish the Autonomous Church in the jurisdiction of Constantinople on the territory of Estonia and committed itself, together with the Moscow Patriarchate 'to cooperate in the matter of presenting their positions to the Estonian government with the objective that all Orthodox Christians have equal rights, including the right to property'."

This agreement de facto led to the existence of two Orthodox churches on the Estonian territory: the Estonian Orthodox Church of Moscow Patriarchate and the Estonian Apostolic Orthodox Church. By this agreement, both the EAOC and the ROC agreed to tolerate each other "at least temporarily". After this decision, in Estonia 54 parishes were part of the EAOC, 29 were part of the ROC.

In September 1996, it was decided to prolong for another three months the moratorium concerning the Ecumenical Patriarchate's 20 February 1996 decision to reactivate its tomos. Other subsequent meetings between the Church of Constantinople and the Russian Orthodox Church were held in order to find a final agreement, but without much results. On 1 September 2000, the Ecumenical Patriarch Bartholomew declared he considered the 16 May 1996 decision as a "decision, which allows the existence of the two parallel jurisdictions in Estonia", while the Russian Orthodox Church officially stated it totally disagreed with this interpretation of the decision by the Ecumenical Patriarch and considered that Estonia was under the canonical jurisdiction of the Moscow Patriarchate and that "the Orthodox communities on the territory of Estonia have been a part of the Russian Orthodox Church for seven centuries".

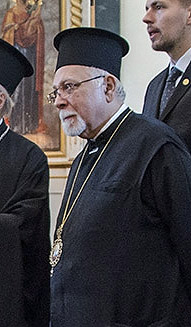
Metropolitan Stephanos of Tallinn and All Estonia

=== Appointment of the Metropolitan of Tallinn and All Estonia by the Ecumenical Patriarchate ===
On 9 March 1999, the Congress of the Estonian Apostolic Orthodox Church met in Tallinn to consider the fact that the church still did not have a primate. Representatives from the Patriarchate of Constantinople were also present at the congress. The Congress decided to ask the Patriarchate to appoint Bishop Stephanos (auxiliary bishop of the Greek Orthodox Metropolitan of France) as primate. On 13 March 1999, the Synod of the Patriarchate of Constantinople accepted the request and elected Stephanos as Metropolitan of Tallinn and All Estonia. While announcing this decision, Patriarch Bartholomew asked the Russian Orthodox Church to recognize Metropolitan Stephan as the "canonical and legal first hierarch of the Estonian Orthodox Church". The Russian Orthodox Church, "surely considering the region of Estonia an autonomous part of the historical canonical territory of the Moscow Patriarchate", refused to recognize the status of Metropolitan Stephanos granted to him by the Ecumenical Patriarchate.

On 21 March 1999, bishop Stephanos was enthroned Metropolitan of Tallinn and All Estonia at the Church of the Transfiguration of Our Lord in Tallinn. Thereafter, Stephanos began preparing the General Assembly of the Church. The General Assembly took place on 21 June 1999 and the organs of the Church, the Synod and the Auditing Committee, were elected there. Moreover, Metropolitan Stephanos announced the names of the vicars general and of his secretariat. In January 2009, the Orthodox Church of Estonia established a synodal structure with the ordinations of two bishops: the bishop Elias (Ojaperv) of Tartu, and the bishop Alexander (Hopjorski) of Pärnu-Saaremaa.

== Aftermath ==
=== Continuous tensions ===
After the Zurich agreement, tensions continued to exist between the Estonian Apostolic Orthodox Church and the Estonian Orthodox Church of Moscow Patriarchate.

Metropolitan Stephanos declared in 1999 and in 2002 that there could only be one local Orthodox church in Estonia, but he does not oppose the Moscow Patriarchate turning the Estonian Orthodox Church of Moscow Patriarchate into a diocese of the Russian Orthodox Church in Estonia. According to the Estonian Apostolic Orthodox Church, the agreements decided at Zurich could have been the base which "could have launched a constructive common future" between both local churches of Estonia (the Estonian Apostolic Orthodox Church and the Estonian Orthodox Church of Moscow Patriarchate), but according to the Estonian Apostolic Orthodox Church the Russian Orthodox Church did not apply those agreements decided at Zurich whereas the Ecumenical Patriarchate did.

On 8 November 2000, in response to the 1 September 2000 visit of the Ecumenical Patriarch in Estonia, the Russian Orthodox Church, in an official statement, explained in details their version of the history of the 1996 schism. This statement also says that the Church of Constantinople had refused to hold the negotiations on 1 September 2000 for the visit of the Ecumenical Patriarch in Estonia; the goal of those negotiations would have been "to put an end to the four-years-long confrontation between the jurisdictions of the two Churches in Estonia". The official statement concluded: "The establishment by the Patriarchate of Constantinople of its jurisdiction in Estonia in February 1996, the appointment of 'Metropolitan of All Estonia' in March 1999 and the announcement made during Patriarch Bartholomew's visit to Estonia in October 2000 of the renunciation of the compromise agreements which envisage parallel presence of the two jurisdiction in Estonia speak for the consistent intention of Constantinople to usurp canonical authority in Estonia and to deprive the Estonian Orthodox Church of the Moscow Patriarchate not only of the legal, but also of the canonical right of succession in the country"

In 2007, delegates from the Russian Orthodox Church walked out of theological discussions with the Catholic Church because the Russian Orthodox Church did not recognize the Estonian Apostolic Orthodox Church and that, according to the statement by the Russian Orthodox Church issued thereafter, "the joint participation by delegates of the Moscow Patriarchate and the so-called Estonian Apostolic Church in an official session would mean the implicit recognition by the Moscow Patriarchate of the canonical (nature) of this church structure."

"In 2008 the Russian Orthodox Church suspended its membership of the Conference of European Churches over the dispute about the non-admittance of that part of the Estonian Orthodox Church which had decided to remain linked to the patriarchate of Moscow."

In 2008, the Russian Orthodox Church issued an ultimatum: the ROC would walk out of the Anglican-Orthodox dialogue if the EAOC was taking part in the dialogue. "In the same year the Russian Orthodox Church terminated its ecumenical dialogue with the Anglicans because the EAOC was participating as a recognized member church in this dialogue."

"The Moscow patriarchate continues to make two major claims that are unacceptable to the EAOC. The first is that the EAOC was established in 1996 (thus negating the Tomos of 1923); and the second is that Estonia remains as a canonical territory of the Russian Orthodox Church – widely taken to be a negation of Estonia as a sovereign state, deserving autocephaly in due season."

On 1 September 2018, Metropolitan Hilarion (Alfeyev), chairman of the Department of External Church Relations of the Russian Orthodox Church, in a message to mass media which was published on the official website of the External Church Relations of the Russian Orthodox Church, declared: "the problem of Estonia, from our point of view, has not been solved, and the existence of two parallel jurisdictions, again from the point of view of church canons, is an anomaly."

=== 2018 Moscow–Constantinople schism ===
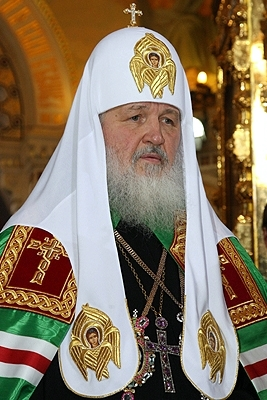
Patriarch Kirill of Moscow who was the Patriarch of Moscow when the 2018 Moscow–Constantinople schism began

The 1996 schism has similarities with the schism of October 2018. Both schisms were caused by a dispute between the Russian Orthodox Church and the Ecumenical Patriarchate over the canonical jurisdiction over a territory in Eastern Europe upon which the Russian Orthodox Church claimed to have the exclusive canonical jurisdiction, territory which after the collapse of the Soviet Union had become an independent state (Ukraine, Estonia). The break of communion in 1996 was made by Moscow unilaterally, as in 2018.

The fact that the 1996 schism over Estonia lasted only three months "has raised hope in some quarters that the new [2018 Moscow–Constantinople] schism might also be short"; a source from the Estonian Apostolic Orthodox Church even declared the Russian Orthodox Church "will likely back down [over Ukraine], just as it did over Estonia". However, on 15 October 2018, just after the break of full communion with the Ecumenical Patriarchate by the ROC, Metropolitan Hilarion, chairman of the Moscow Patriarchate's Department for External Church Relations, said in an interview to the mass media that "in 1996, the Church of Constantinople intruded into canonical territory of the Russian Church by establishing its jurisdiction in Estonia, and we were forced to break the Eucharistic communion with this Church"; Hilarion added that the Russian Orthodox Church "had not recognized this decision [of the Ecumenical Patriarchate in 1996] and do[es] not recognize it. However, the canonical crimes committed by the Patriarchate of Constantinople now [in 2018 after the 11 October 2018 declaration of the Ecumenical Patriarchate] are more grievous as it declared its intention to grant an autocephaly to a part of the Russian Orthodox Church, and not the part which once belonged to Constantinople."

In an interview given to the BBC on 2 November 2018, Archbishop Job, hierarch of the Church of Constantinople, rejected the idea that there could be two jurisdictions over Ukraine the way there is two jurisdictions in Estonia, stating that canonically there could be only one church on the territory of Ukraine and that therefore an exarchate of the Russian Orthodox Church in Ukraine was "simply uncanonical" and that in Ukraine "there can be no repetition of Estonia's scenario".

== See also ==
- List of the primates the Estonian Orthodox Church

Other similar schisms in Christianity:

- Schism of 1054
- 15th–16th century Moscow–Constantinople schism
- Bulgarian schism
- 2018 Moscow–Constantinople schism

Other related topics:

- Eastern Orthodox Church organization
- Phyletism
- Estonian nationalism
- Russian irredentism
- Russian nationalism
