= Esil District, Akmola Region =

Coordinates: 51.9555°N 66.4043°E

Esil
- District
- Esıl audany
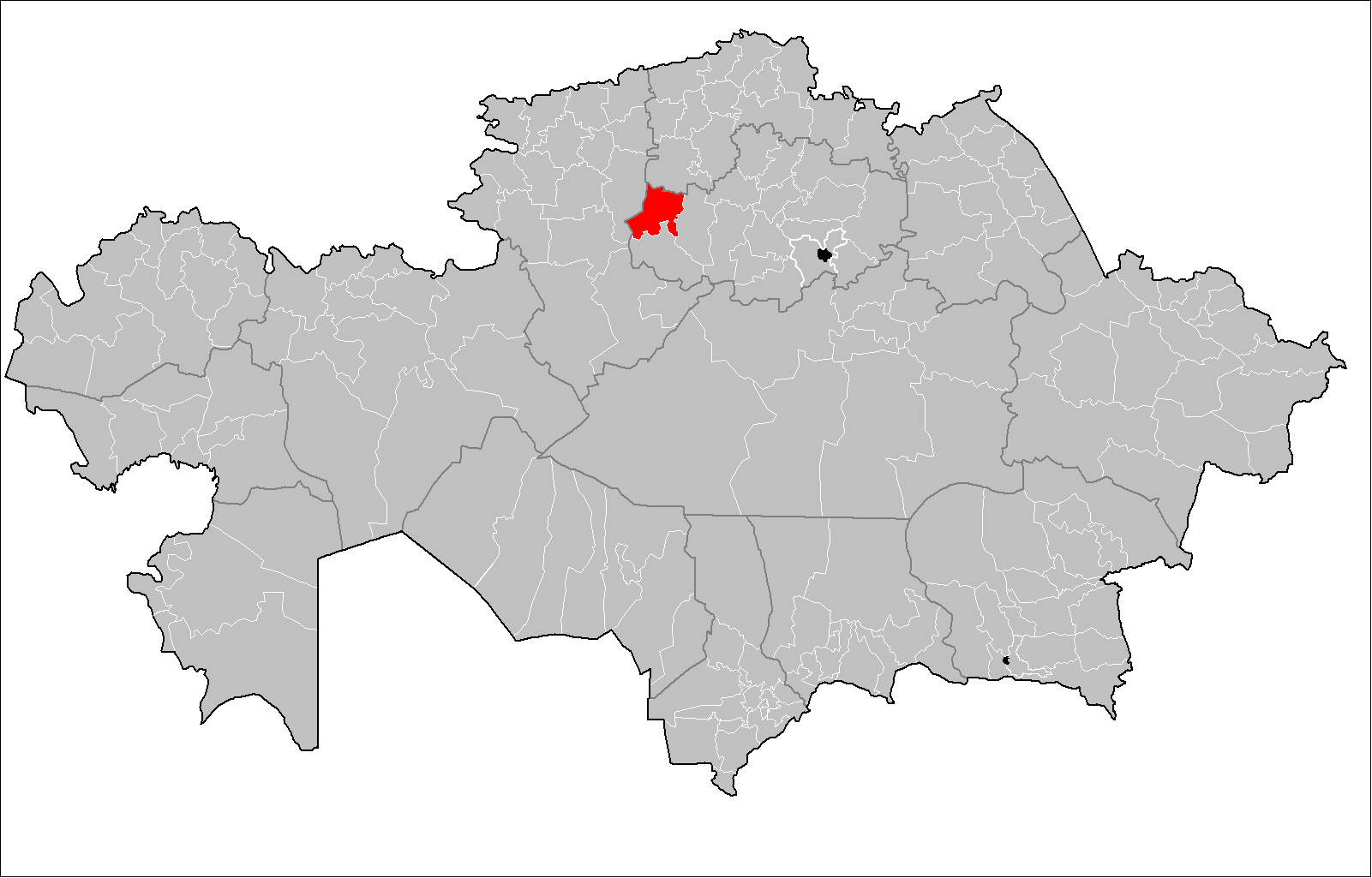
- Country: Kazakhstan
- Region: Aqmola Region
- Administrative center: Esil
- Founded: 1936

Government
  - Akim: Serik Balzhanov

Area
  - Total: 8,000 km^{2} (3,100 sq mi)

Population (2013)
  - Total: 26,307
- Time zone: UTC+6 (East)

Esil District (Kazakh: Есіл ауданы, Esıl audany) is a district of Akmola region in northern Kazakhstan. The administrative center of the district is the town of Esil.

It has a population of 27,697 (2009 census results); and 37,309 (1999 census results).
