= Tohvri =

Tohvri may refer to several places in Estonia:

- Tohvri, Hiiu County, village in Emmaste Parish, Hiiu County
- Tohvri, Viljandi County, village in Pärsti Parish, Viljandi County
