= Kalgi, Estonia =

Village in Estonia

Kalgi
- Village
- Location within Estonia
- Coordinates: 58°52′N 22°56′E
- Country: Estonia
- County: Hiiu County
- Parish: Hiiumaa Parish
- Time zone: UTC+2 (EET)
  - Summer (DST): UTC+3 (EEST)

Kalgi is a village in Hiiumaa Parish, Hiiu County in northwestern Estonia.

The village was formed between 1920s and 1930s. Historically, the areas of village were part of Suuremõisa Manor (German: Grossenhof).

From 1977 to 1997, Kalgi was part of the village of Viilupi.
