= Hellamaa =

Hellamaa may refer to several places in Estonia:

- Hellamaa, Hiiu County, village in Estonia
- Hellamaa, Saare County, village in Estonia
