= Tammela =

Tammela may refer to:

- Tammela, Estonia, a village in Hiiumaa Parish, Hiiu County, Estonia
- Tammela, Finland, a municipality in the province of Southern Finland
- Tammela, Tampere, a city district in Tampere, Finland
- Tammela Square, a market square in Tampere, Finland
- Tammela Stadion, a football stadium in Tampere, Finland
