= Kärdla-Nõmme =

Village in Estonia

- Village
- Location within Estonia
- Coordinates: 58°59′28″N 22°44′11″E
- Country: Estonia
- County: Hiiu County
- Parish: Hiiumaa Parish
- Time zone: UTC+2 (EET)
  - Summer (DST): UTC+3 (EEST)

Kärdla-Nõmme (until 2017 Nõmme) is a village in Hiiumaa Parish, Hiiu County in northwestern Estonia.

Historically, the areas of village were part of Kärdla Manor (German: Kertel).

Kärdla-Nõmme got its village status in 1997. Before 1977 the village was part of Tubala village, and earlier part of Kärdla settlement (Estonian: Kärdla asundus).
