= Hiiumaa Parish =

Municipality of Estonia

Hiiumaa Parish Hiiumaa vald
- Municipality of Estonia
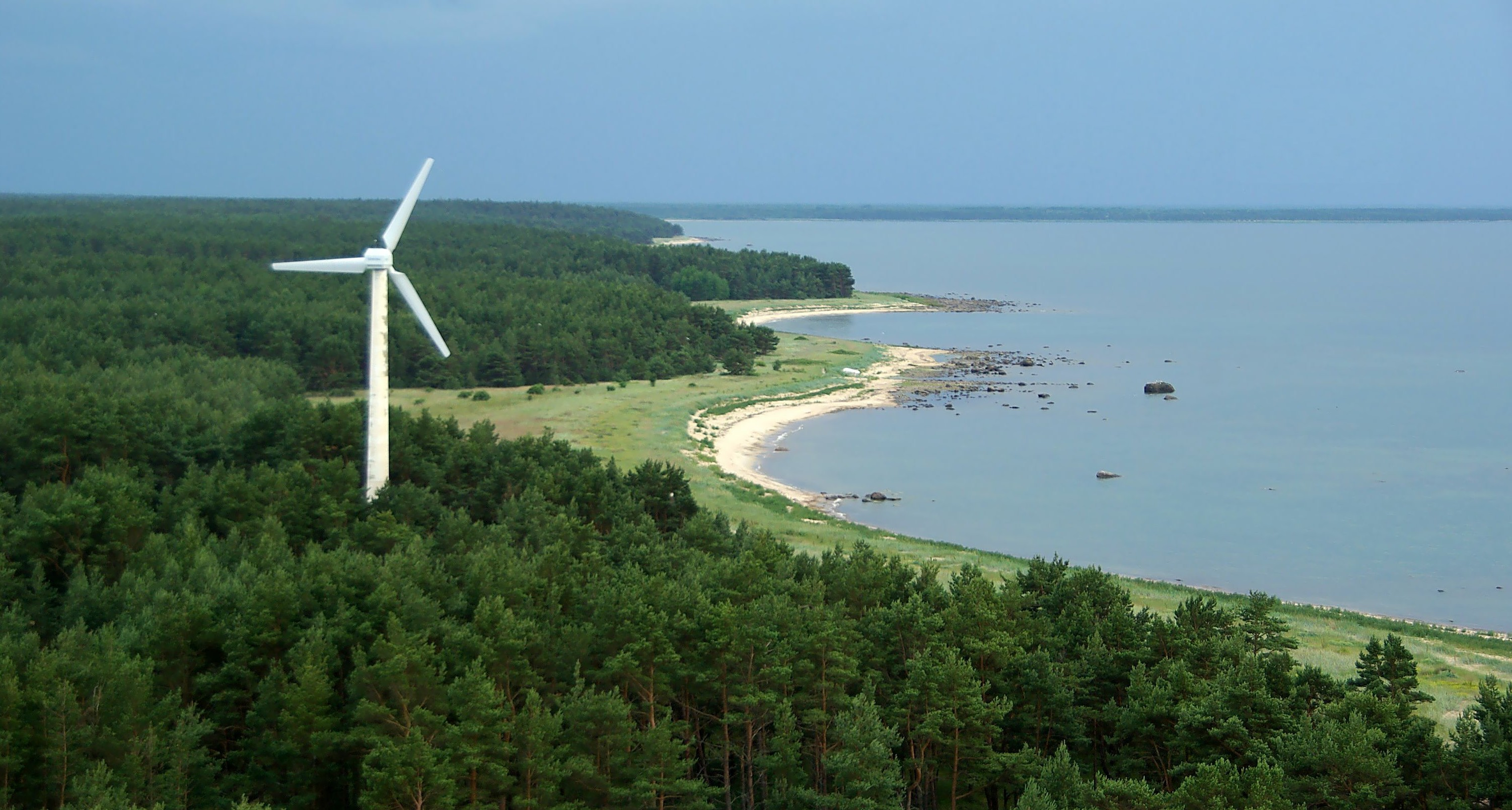
- Tahkuna Peninsula

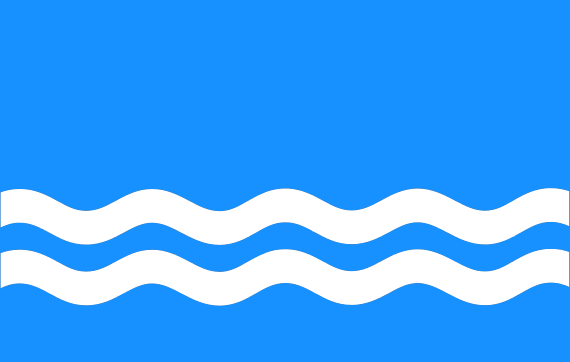
- Flag Coat of arms

- Hiiumaa Parish
- Coordinates: 59°00′N 22°48′E
- Country: Estonia
- County: Hiiu
- Established: 2017
- Administrative centre: Kärdla

Government
  - Mayor (Vallavanem): Hergo Tasuja (Social Democratic Party)

Area
  - Total: 1,023 km^{2} (395 sq mi)

Population
  - Total: 8,497
  - Density: 8.306/km^{2} (21.51/sq mi)
- Time zone: UTC+2 (EET)
  - Summer (DST): UTC+3 (EEST)
- ISO 3166 code: EE-205
- Website: vald.hiiumaa.ee

Hiiumaa Parish (Estonian: Hiiumaa vald) is a rural municipality of Estonia on the island of Hiiumaa. Hiiumaa Parish was established by merging Emmaste Parish, Hiiu Parish, Käina Parish and Pühalepa Parish after the municipal elections held on 15 October 2017. Kärdla is the administrative center of the municipality. The current mayor (vallavanem) is Hergo Tasuja. The municipalities of Emmaste and Pühalepa contested their forced merger with Hiiu and Käina to form the new Hiiumaa municipality, which includes the whole island and what is Hiiu County.

== Settlements ==
There is one town, Kärdla, two small boroughs (alevik): Käina and Kõrgessaare, and 182 villages in Hiiumaa Parish:

- Aadma
- Ala
- Allika
- Aruküla
- Emmaste
- Emmaste-Kurisu
- Emmaste-Selja
- Esiküla
- Hagaste
- Haldi
- Haldreka
- Harju
- Hausma
- Heigi
- Heiste
- Heistesoo
- Hellamaa
- Heltermaa
- Hiiessaare
- Hilleste
- Hindu
- Hirmuste
- Härma
- Hüti
- Isabella
- Jausa
- Jõeküla
- Jõeranna
- Jõesuu
- Kaasiku
- Kabuna
- Kaderna
- Kaigutsi
- Kalana
- Kaleste
- Kalgi
- Kanapeeksi
- Kassari
- Kauste
- Kerema
- Kidaste
- Kiduspe
- Kiivera
- Kitsa
- Kleemu
- Kodeste
- Kogri
- Koidma
- Kolga
- Kopa
- Kukka
- Kuri
- Kuriste
- Kurisu
- Kuusiku
- Kõlunõmme
- Kõmmusselja
- Kõpu
- Kärdla-Nõmme
- Külaküla
- Külama
- Laartsa
- Laasi
- Lassi
- Laheküla
- Lauka
- Leerimetsa
- Lehtma
- Leigri
- Leisu
- Lelu
- Lepiku
- Ligema
- Lilbi
- Linnumäe
- Loja
- Luguse
- Luidja
- Lõbembe
- Lõpe
- Malvaste
- Mangu
- Mardihansu
- Meelste
- Metsaküla
- Metsalauka
- Metsapere
- Moka
- Muda
- Mudaste
- Mäeküla
- Mäeltse
- Mägipe
- Männamaa
- Mänspe
- Määvli
- Napi
- Nasva
- Niidiküla
- Nurste
- Nõmba
- Nõmme
- Nõmmerga
- Ogandi
- Ojaküla
- Ole
- Orjaku
- Otste
- Palade
- Palli
- Paluküla
- Paope
- Partsi
- Pihla
- Pilpaküla
- Poama
- Prassi
- Prähnu
- Prählamäe
- Puliste
- Puski
- Putkaste
- Pärna
- Pärnselja
- Pühalepa
- Pühalepa-Harju
- Rannaküla
- Reheselja
- Reigi
- Reigi-Nõmme
- Reikama
- Riidaküla
- Risti
- Ristivälja
- Rootsi
- Sakla
- Salinõmme
- Sarve
- Selja
- Sepaste
- Sigala
- Sinima
- Soonlepa
- Suuremõisa
- Suurepsi
- Suureranna
- Suuresadama
- Sõru
- Sääre
- Sülluste
- Taguküla
- Tahkuna
- Tammela
- Tammistu
- Tareste
- Taterma
- Tempa
- Tiharu
- Tilga
- Tohvri
- Tubala
- Tärkma
- Ulja
- Undama
- Utu
- Vaemla
- Vahtrepa
- Valgu
- Valipe
- Vanamõisa
- Viilupi
- Viiri
- Viita
- Viitasoo
- Vilima
- Vilivalla
- Villamaa
- Villemi
- Värssu
- Õngu
- Ühtri
- Ülendi
