= Tareste, Hiiu County =

Village in Estonia

Tareste
- Village
- Location within Estonia
- Coordinates: 59°00′59″N 22°40′57″E
- Country: Estonia
- County: Hiiu County
- Parish: Hiiumaa Parish
- Time zone: UTC+2 (EET)
  - Summer (DST): UTC+3 (EEST)

Tareste is a village in Hiiumaa Parish, Hiiu County in northwestern Estonia.
