= Mäeltse =

Village in Estonia

- Village
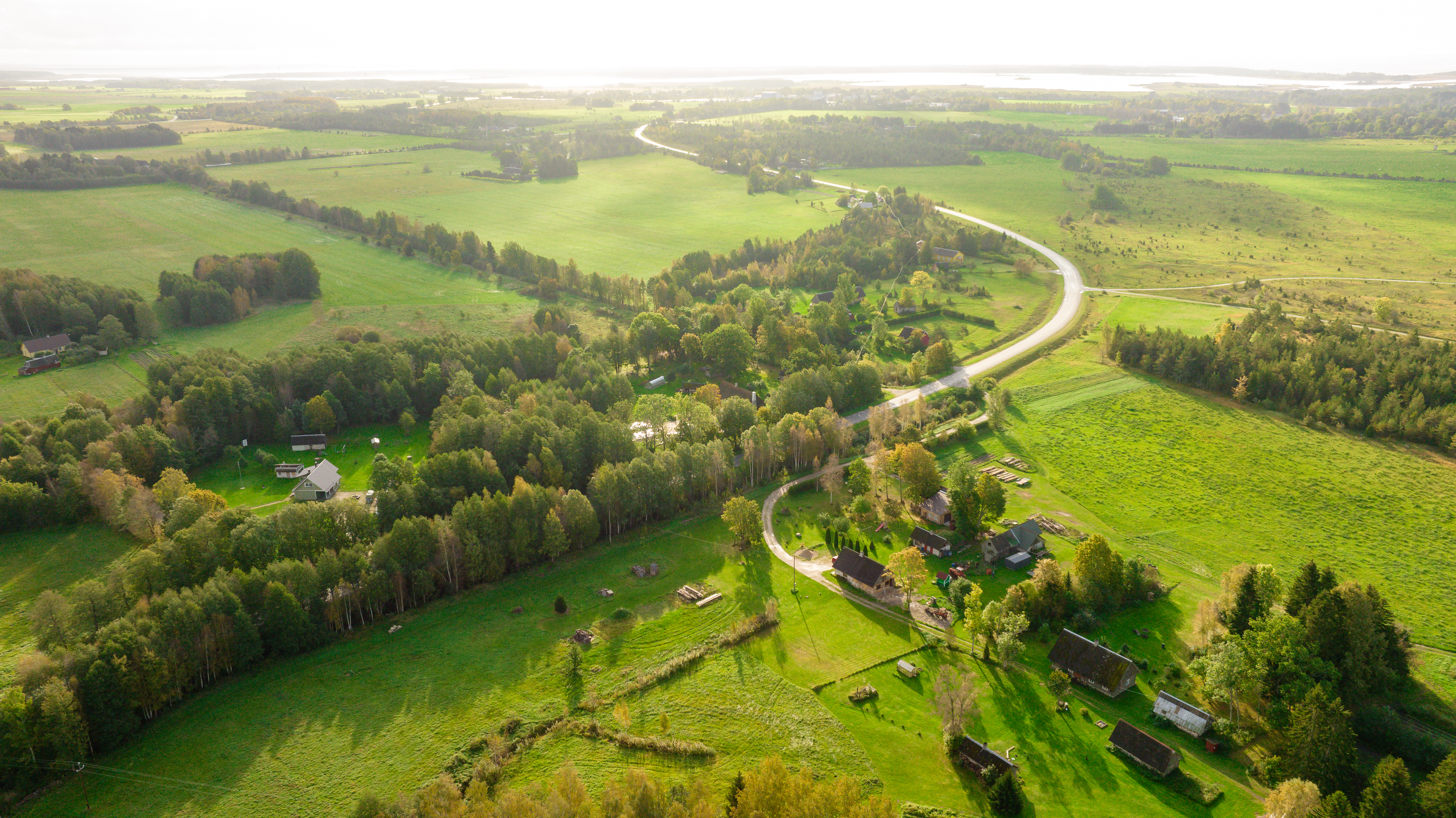
- An aerial view of Mäeltse

- Location within Estonia
- Coordinates: 58°50′54″N 22°44′46″E
- Country: Estonia
- County: Hiiu County
- Parish: Hiiumaa Parish
- Time zone: UTC+2 (EET)
  - Summer (DST): UTC+3 (EEST)

Mäeltse is a village in Hiiumaa Parish, Hiiu County in northwestern Estonia.
