= Kerema, Estonia =

Village in Estonia

Kerema
- Village
- Location within Estonia
- Coordinates: 58°53′34″N 22°57′11″E
- Country: Estonia
- County: Hiiu County
- Parish: Hiiumaa Parish

Area
  - Total: 5.56 km^{2} (2.15 sq mi)

Population (2021)
  - Total: 19
  - Density: 3.42/km^{2} (8.9/sq mi)
- Time zone: UTC+2 (EET)
  - Summer (DST): UTC+3 (EEST)

Kerema is a village in Hiiumaa Parish, Hiiu County in northwestern Estonia. As of 2021 it had a population of 19, and has an area of 5.56 km^{2}, with a population density of 3.42 people per square kilometre.
