= Lõpe, Hiiu County =

Village in Estonia

Lõpe
- Village
- Location within Estonia
- Coordinates: 58°57′50″N 22°49′21″E
- Country: Estonia
- County: Hiiu County
- Parish: Hiiumaa Parish
- Time zone: UTC+2 (EET)
  - Summer (DST): UTC+3 (EEST)

Lõpe is a village in Hiiumaa Parish, Hiiu County in northwestern Estonia.
