= Hausma =

Village in Estonia

- Village
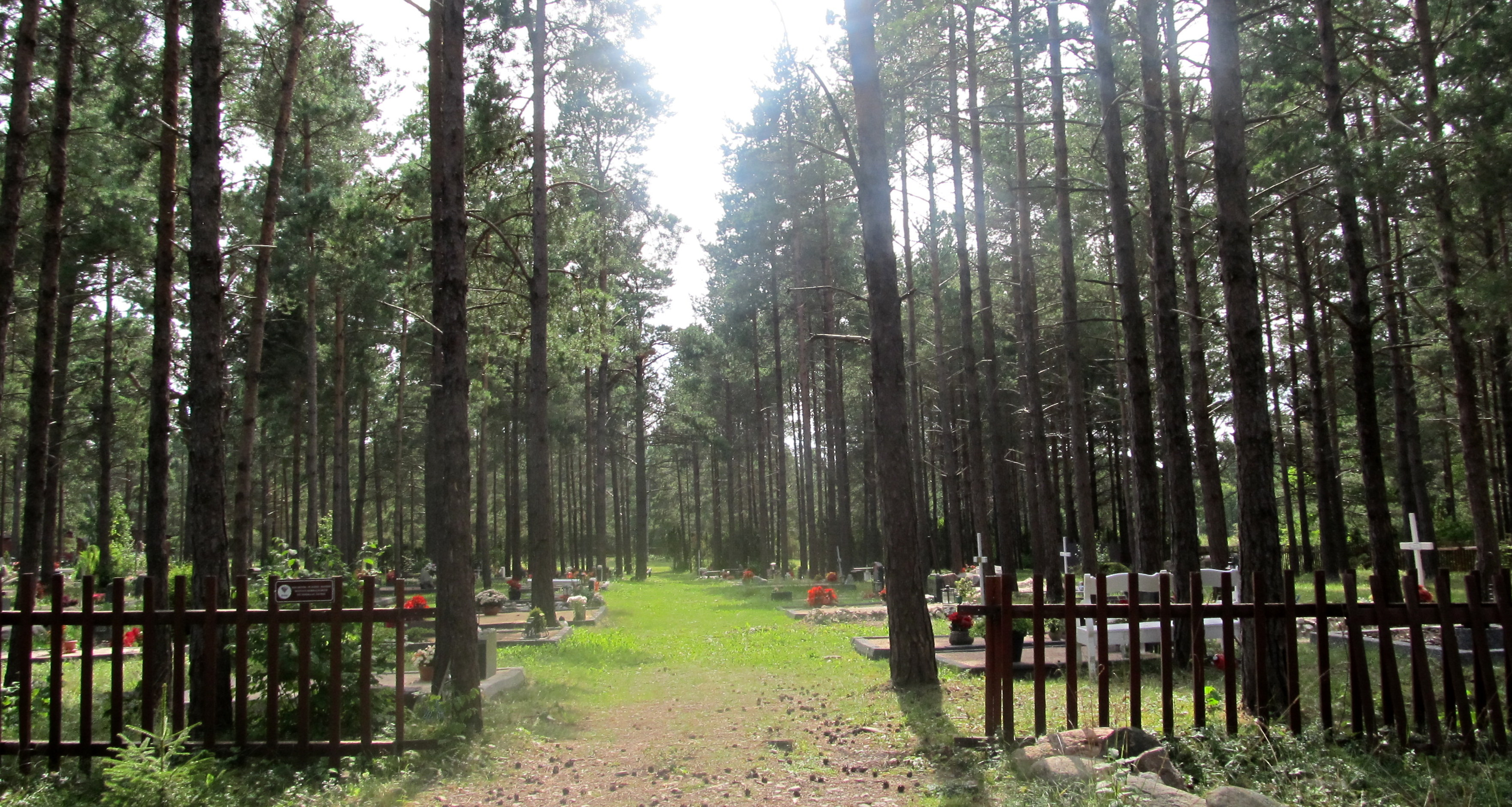
- Kärdla cemetery in Hausma

- Location within Estonia
- Coordinates: 58°59′N 22°47′E
- Country: Estonia
- County: Hiiu County
- Parish: Hiiumaa Parish
- Time zone: UTC+2 (EET)
  - Summer (DST): UTC+3 (EEST)

Hausma is a village in Hiiumaa Parish, Hiiu County in northwestern Estonia.

The village was first mentioned in 1564 (Hakelax). Historically, the village was part of Suuremõisa Manor (German: Grossenhof).

The village's eastern part is named as Heilu. Before 1940s Heilu was a standalone village.
