= Niidiküla =

Village in Estonia

Niiduküla
- Village
- Location within Estonia
- Coordinates: 58.8422°N 22.8364°E
- Country: Estonia
- County: Hiiu County
- Parish: Hiiumaa Parish
- Time zone: UTC+2 (EET)
  - Summer (DST): UTC+3 (EEST)

Niidiküla

Niidiküla is a village in Hiiumaa Parish, Hiiu County in northwestern Estonia.

According to the 2000 census, the population of Niidiküla was 18.
