= Pühalepa-Harju =

Village in Estonia

- Village
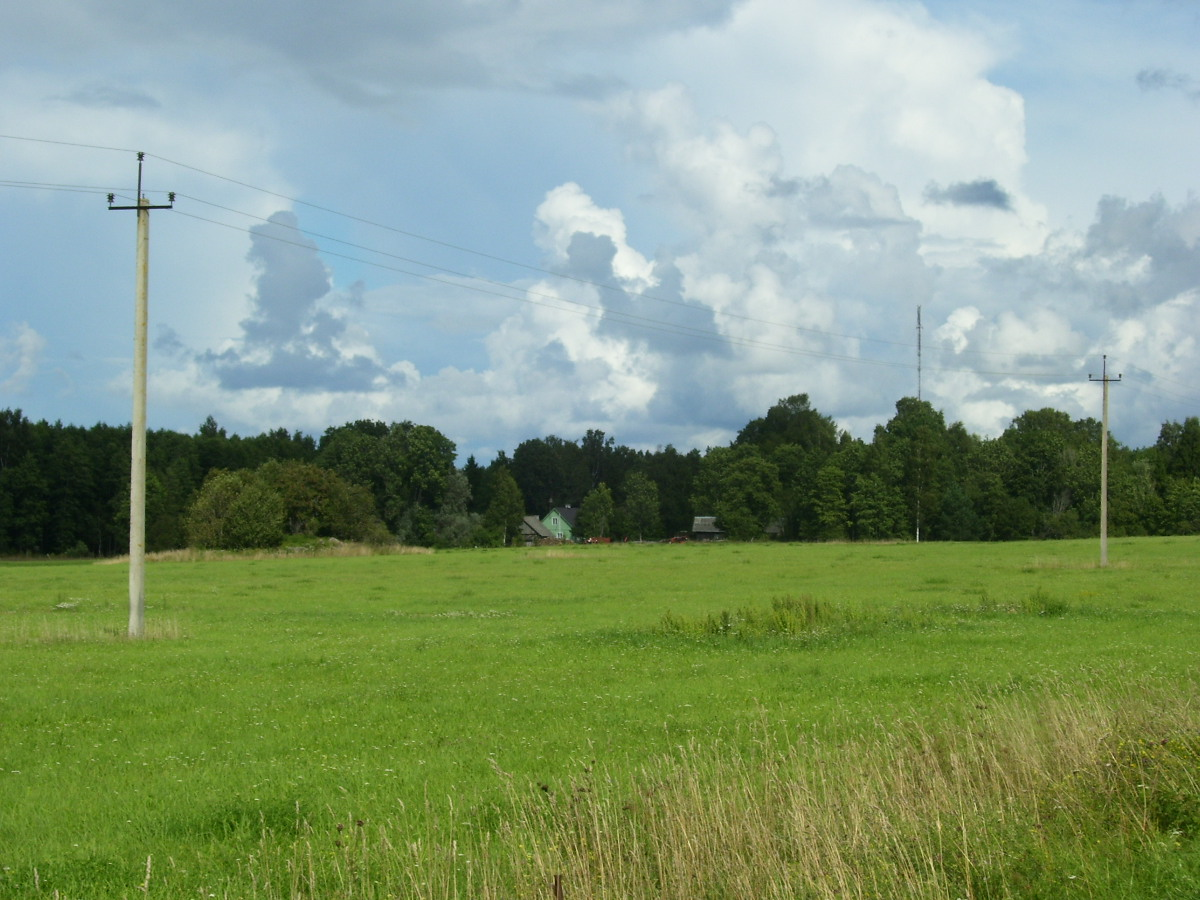
- Farmstead of Kopli in Pühalepa-Harju

- Location within Estonia
- Coordinates: 58°57′26″N 22°54′13″E
- Country: Estonia
- County: Hiiu County
- Parish: Hiiumaa Parish
- Time zone: UTC+2 (EET)
  - Summer (DST): UTC+3 (EEST)

Pühalepa-Harju (Harju until 2017) is a village in Hiiumaa Parish, Hiiu County in northwestern Estonia.

Poet and children's writer Julius Oengo (1901–1941) was born in Harju village.
