= Aadma =

Village in Estonia

- Village
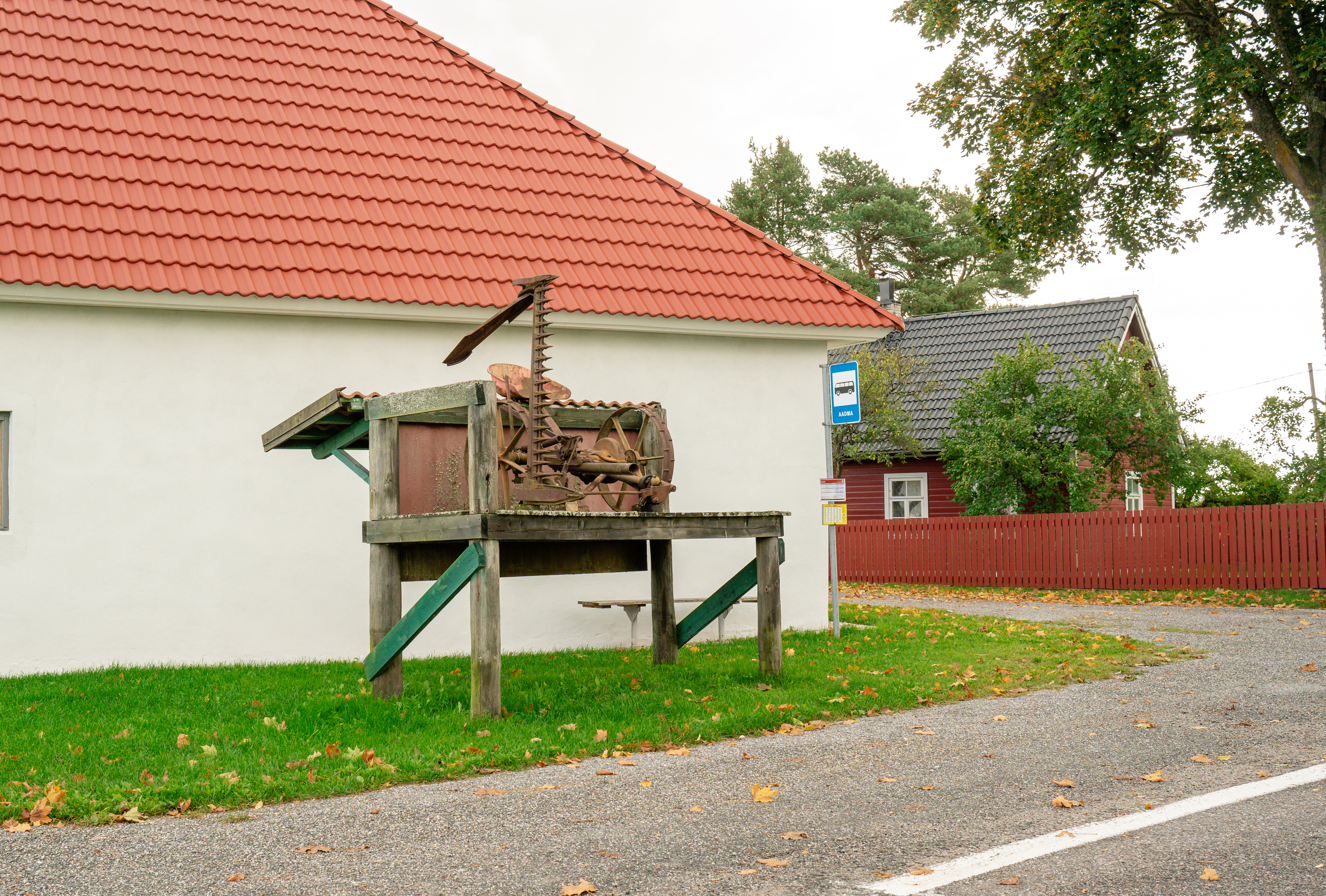

- Location within Estonia
- Coordinates: 58°48′N 22°40′E
- Country: Estonia
- County: Hiiu County
- Parish: Hiiumaa Parish
- Time zone: UTC+2 (EET)
  - Summer (DST): UTC+3 (EEST)

Aadma (German: Ahdma) is a village in Hiiumaa Parish, Hiiu County in northwestern Estonia.

Aadma has village status since 1939. Before there existed Aadma Manor (German: Ahdma).
