= Jausa =

Village in northwestern Estonia

- Village
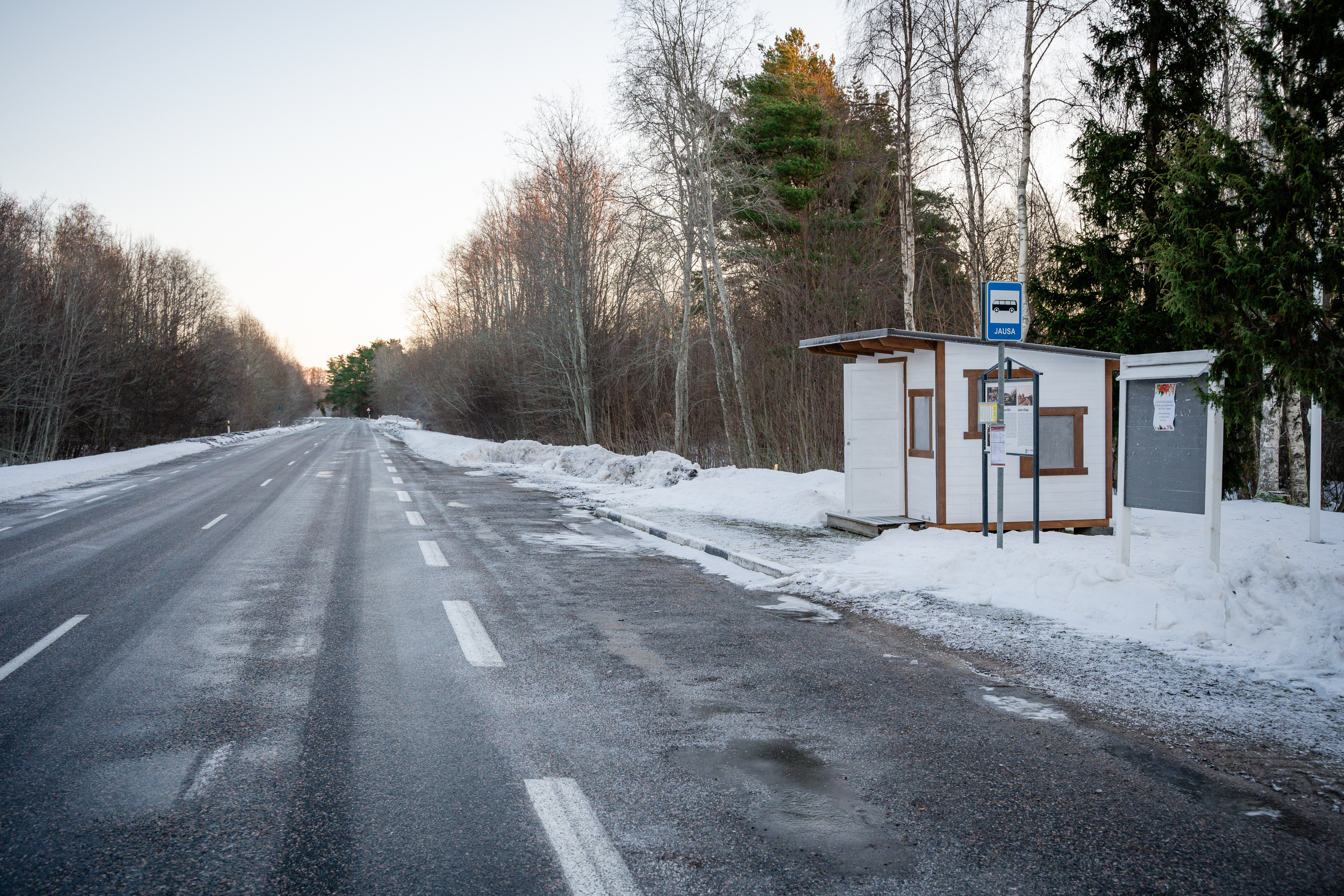
- A snowy road near a bus stop.

- Location within Estonia
- Coordinates: 58°47′N 22°42′E
- Country: Estonia
- County: Hiiu County
- Parish: Hiiumaa Parish
- Time zone: UTC+2 (EET)
  - Summer (DST): UTC+3 (EEST)

Jausa is a village in Hiiumaa Parish, Hiiu County in northwestern Estonia.

The village was first mentioned in 1564 (Joosz dorp). Historically, the village was part of Aadma Manor (German: Ahdma) and Putkaste Manor (German: Putkas).

The southwestern part of the village is known as Remmaots.
