= Kaasiku, Hiiu County =

Village in Estonia

Kaasiku
- Village
- Location within Estonia
- Coordinates: 58°51′14″N 22°49′48″E
- Country: Estonia
- County: Hiiu County
- Parish: Hiiumaa Parish
- Time zone: UTC+2 (EET)
  - Summer (DST): UTC+3 (EEST)

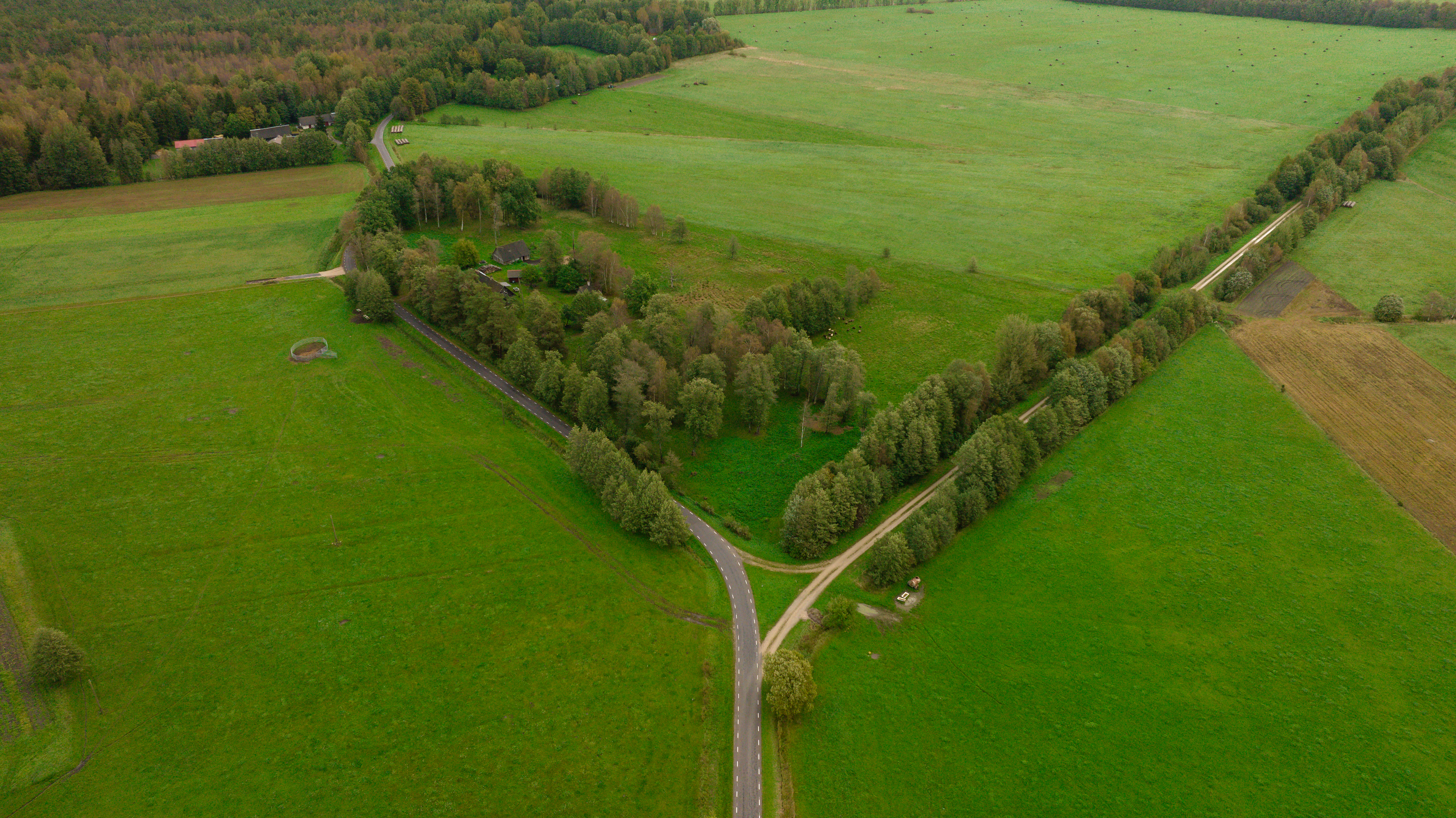
A road near Kaasiku, Hiiu County (2023)

Kaasiku is a village in Hiiumaa Parish, Hiiu County in northwestern Estonia.

The village is established in 1867. Historically, the village was part of Vaemla Manor (German: Waimel).
