= Kogri =

Village in Estonia

- Village
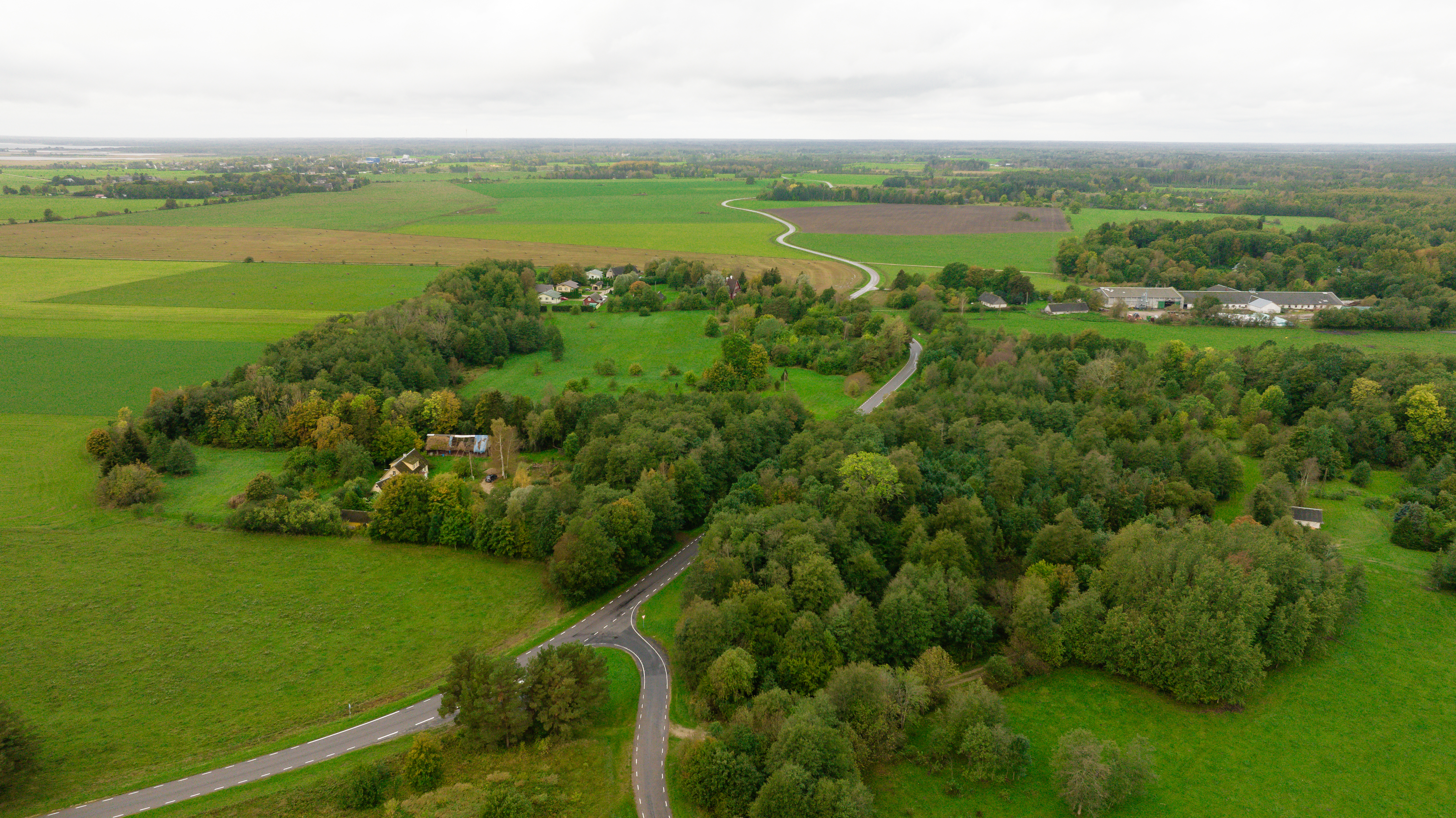

- Location within Estonia
- Coordinates: 58°51′N 22°49′E
- Country: Estonia
- County: Hiiu County
- Parish: Hiiumaa Parish
- Time zone: UTC+2 (EET)
  - Summer (DST): UTC+3 (EEST)

Kogri is a village in Hiiumaa Parish, Hiiu County in northwestern Estonia.
