= Harju, Hiiu County =

Village in Estonia

Harju
- Village
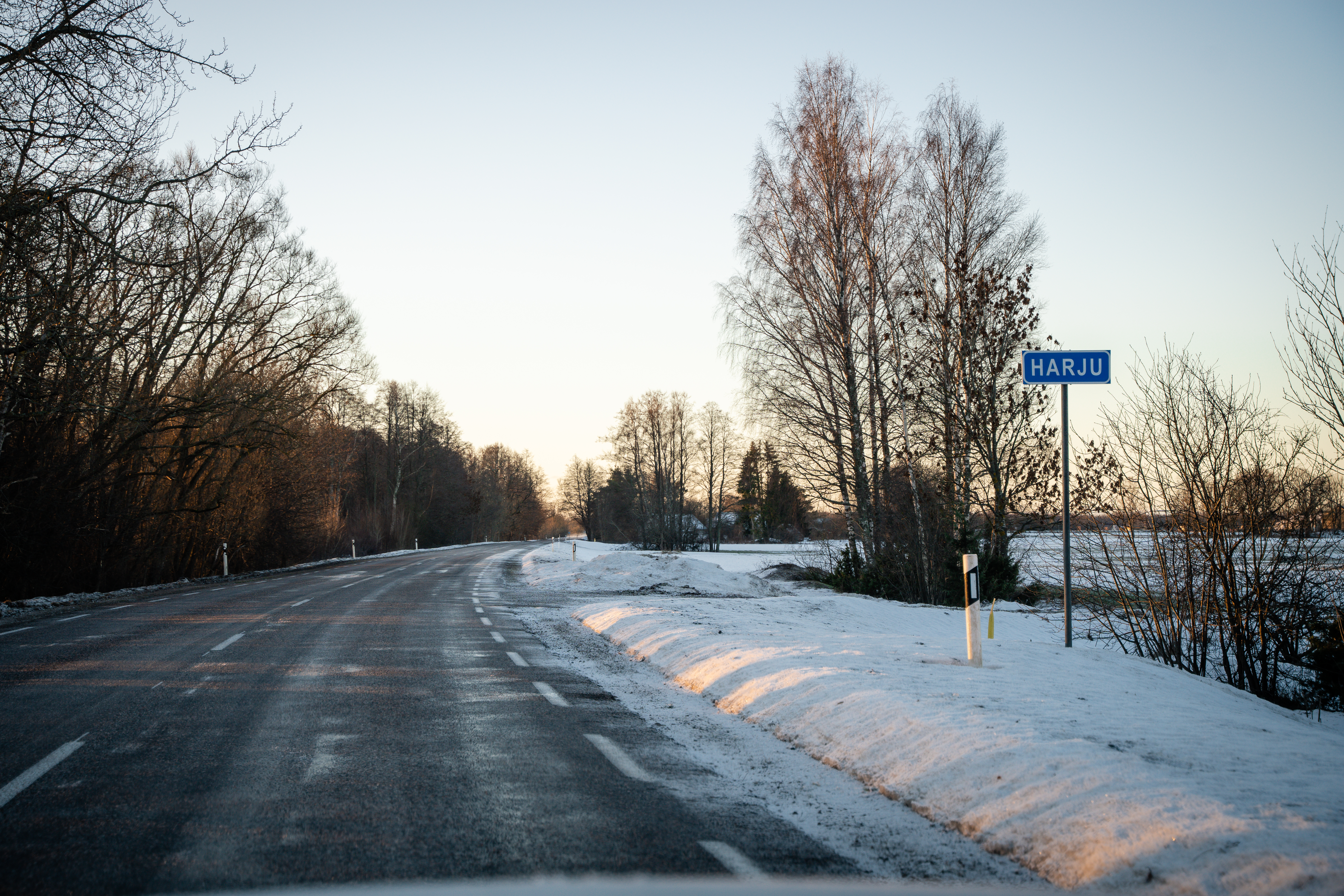

- Location within Estonia
- Coordinates: 58°44′16″N 22°37′33″E
- Country: Estonia
- County: Hiiu County
- Parish: Hiiumaa Parish
- Time zone: UTC+2 (EET)
  - Summer (DST): UTC+3 (EEST)

Harju is a village in Hiiumaa Parish, Hiiu County in northwestern Estonia.

The village was first mentioned in 1565 (Harie by). Historically, the village was part of Vaemla Manor (German: Waimel).
