= Kaigutsi =

Village in Estonia

- Village
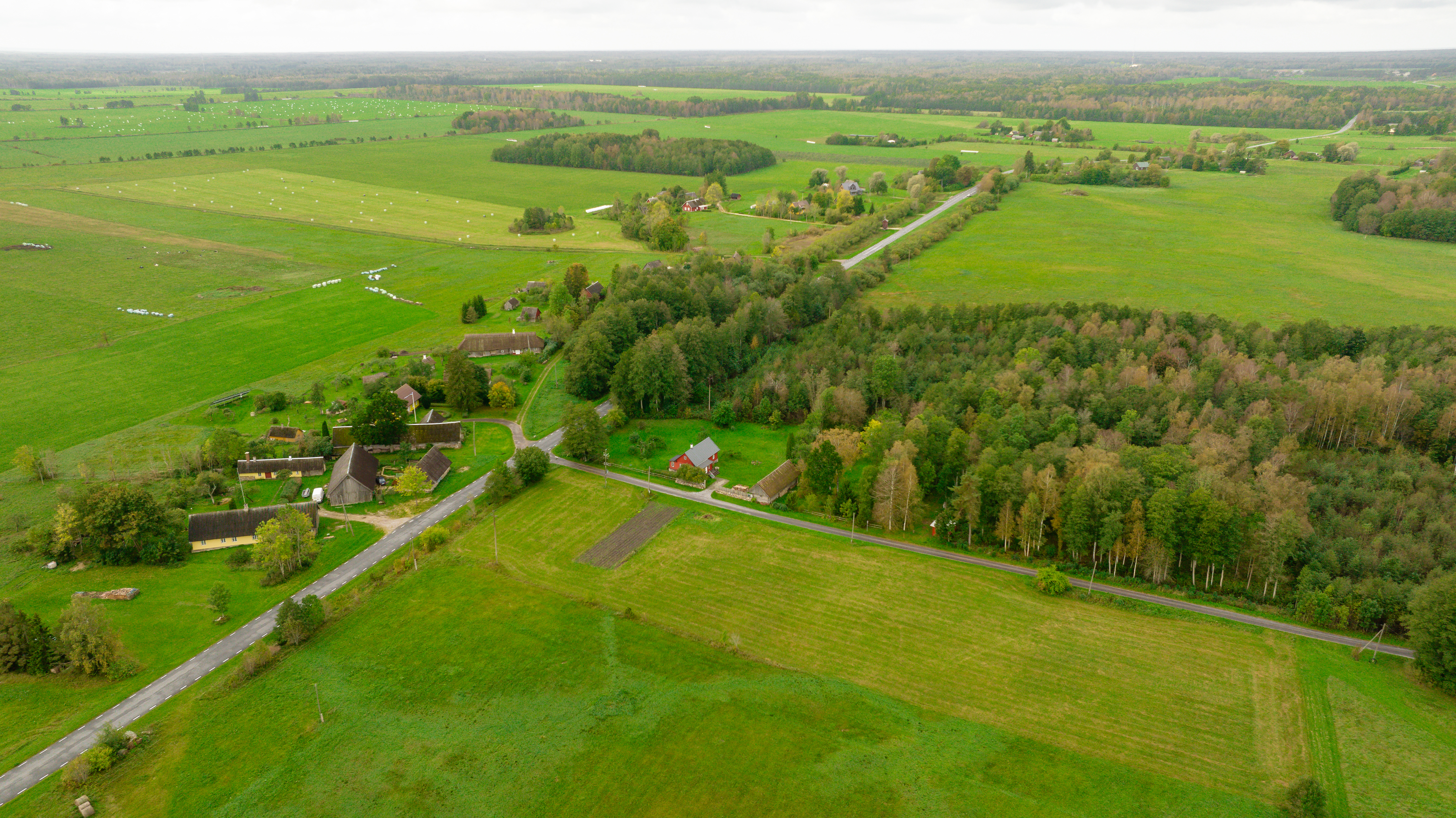

- Location within Estonia
- Coordinates: 58°50′06″N 22°41′00″E
- Country: Estonia
- County: Hiiu County
- Parish: Hiiumaa Parish
- Time zone: UTC+2 (EET)
  - Summer (DST): UTC+3 (EEST)

Kaigutsi is a village in Hiiumaa Parish, Hiiu County in northwestern Estonia.

The village was first mentioned in 1591 (Kaickotz). Historically, the village was part of Käina Church Manor (Estonian: Käina kirikumõis).
