= Kassari (village) =

Village in Estonia

- Village
- Location within Estonia
- Coordinates: 58°48′N 22°50′E
- Country: Estonia
- County: Hiiu County
- Parish: Hiiumaa Parish
- Time zone: UTC+2 (EET)
  - Summer (DST): UTC+3 (EEST)

Kassari is a village in Hiiumaa Parish, Hiiu County in northwestern Estonia, on Kassari Island.

Historically, the village was part of Kassari Manor (German: Kassar). In the 1920s the manor was changed to Kassari settlement (Estonian: Kassari asundus). Kassari got its village status around 1939. In 1977, the Uusküla village was merged into Kassari village.

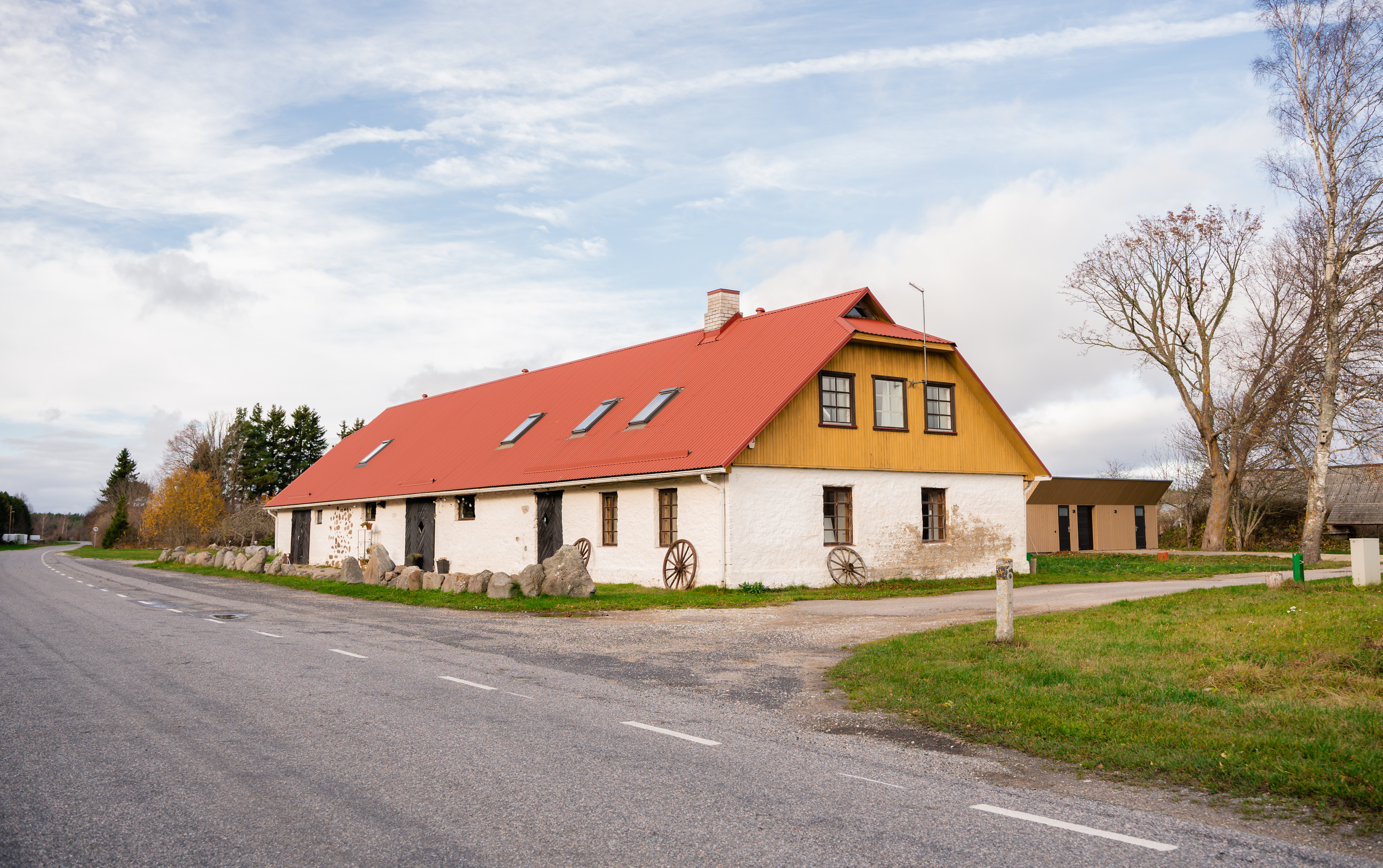

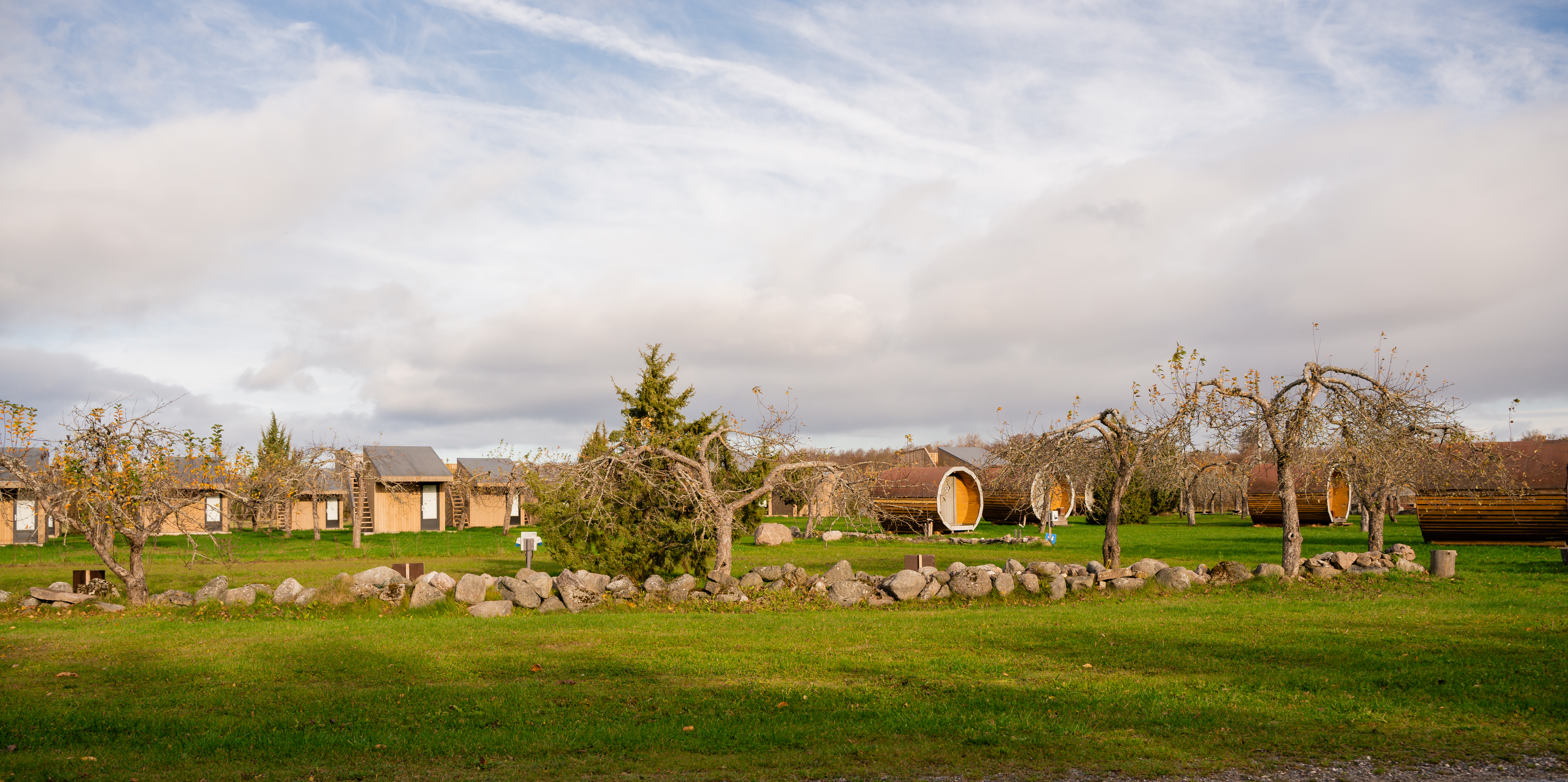

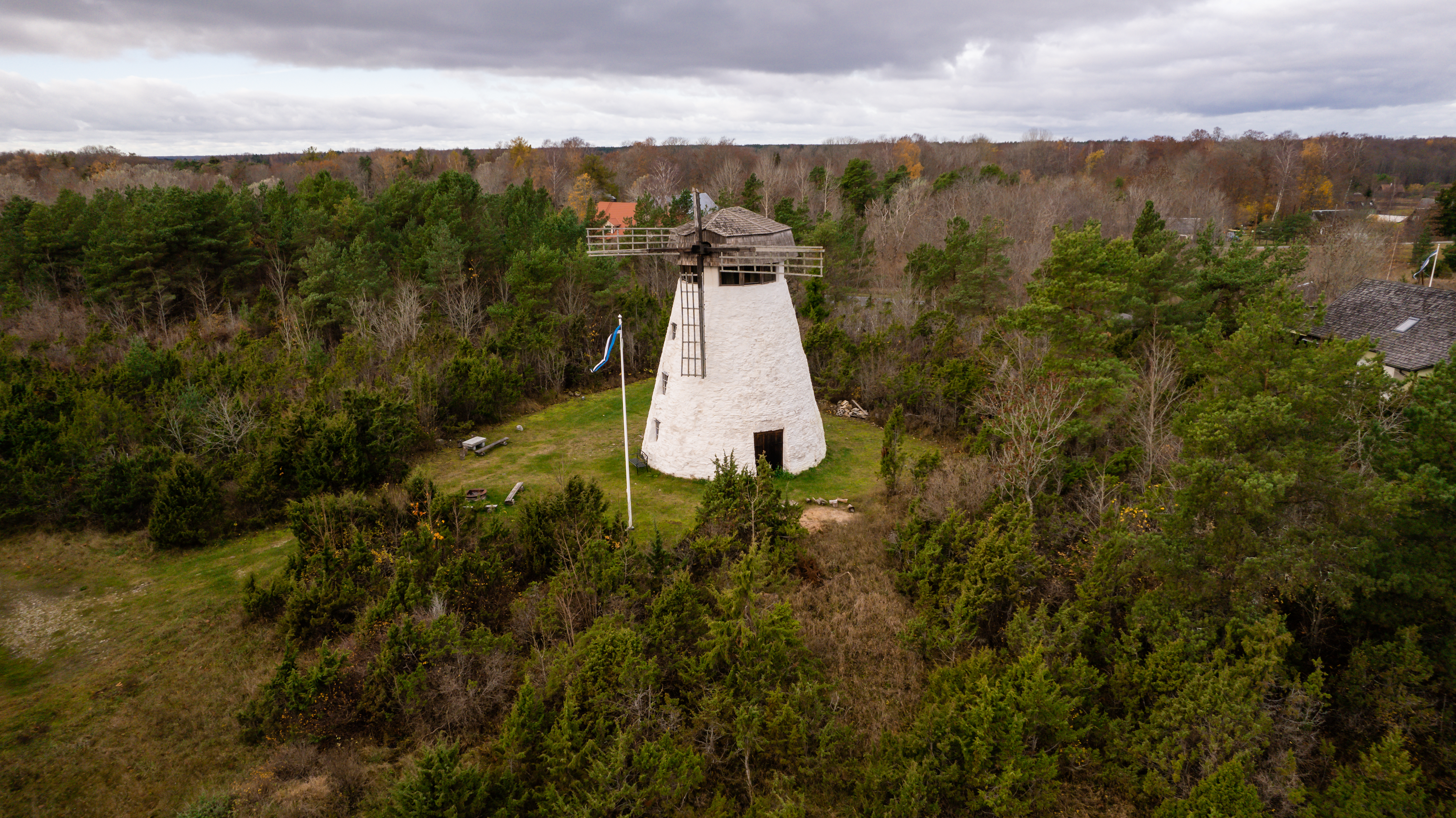
