= Hellamaa, Hiiu County =

Village in Estonia

Hellamaa
- Village
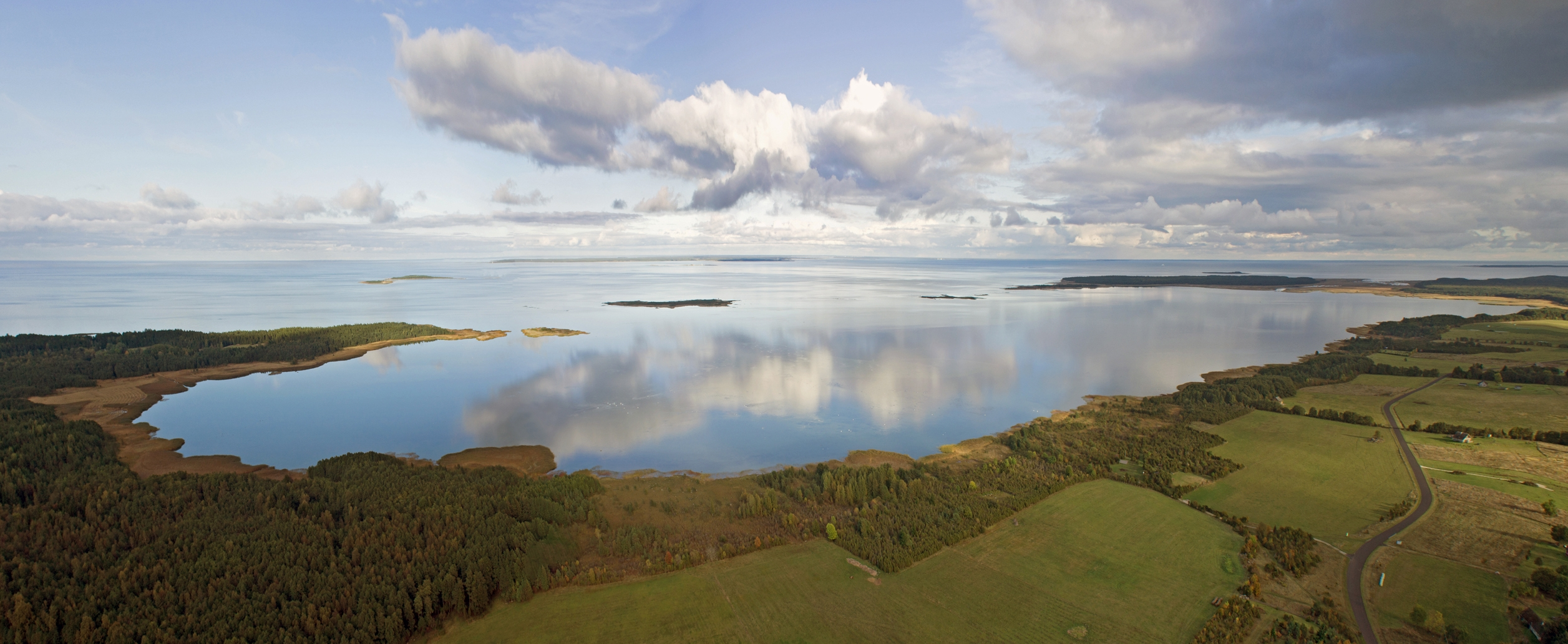
- Hellamaa panorama

- Location within Estonia
- Coordinates: 58°56′27″N 22°55′59″E
- Country: Estonia
- County: Hiiu County
- Parish: Hiiumaa Parish
- Time zone: UTC+2 (EET)
  - Summer (DST): UTC+3 (EEST)

Hellamaa is a village in Hiiumaa Parish, Hiiu County in northwestern Estonia.

The village was first mentioned in 1565 (Hellemaa, or Hallemäky wacka), or 1798 (Hellama). Historically, the village was part of Suuremõisa Manor (German: Grossenhof).
