= Hiiu Parish =

Former municipality of Estonia

Coordinates: 59°00′N 22°45′E

Hiiu Parish Hiiu vald
- Former municipality of Estonia
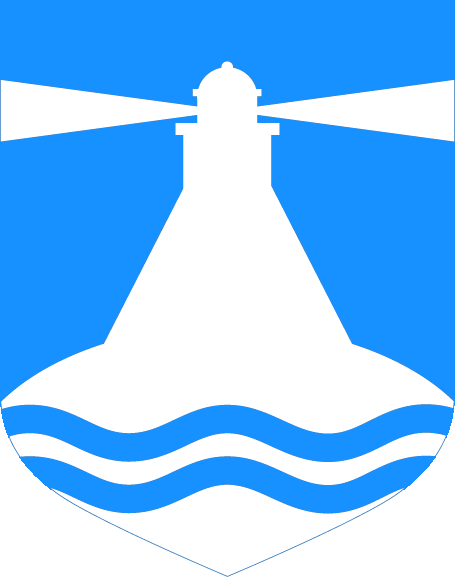
- Flag Coat of arms

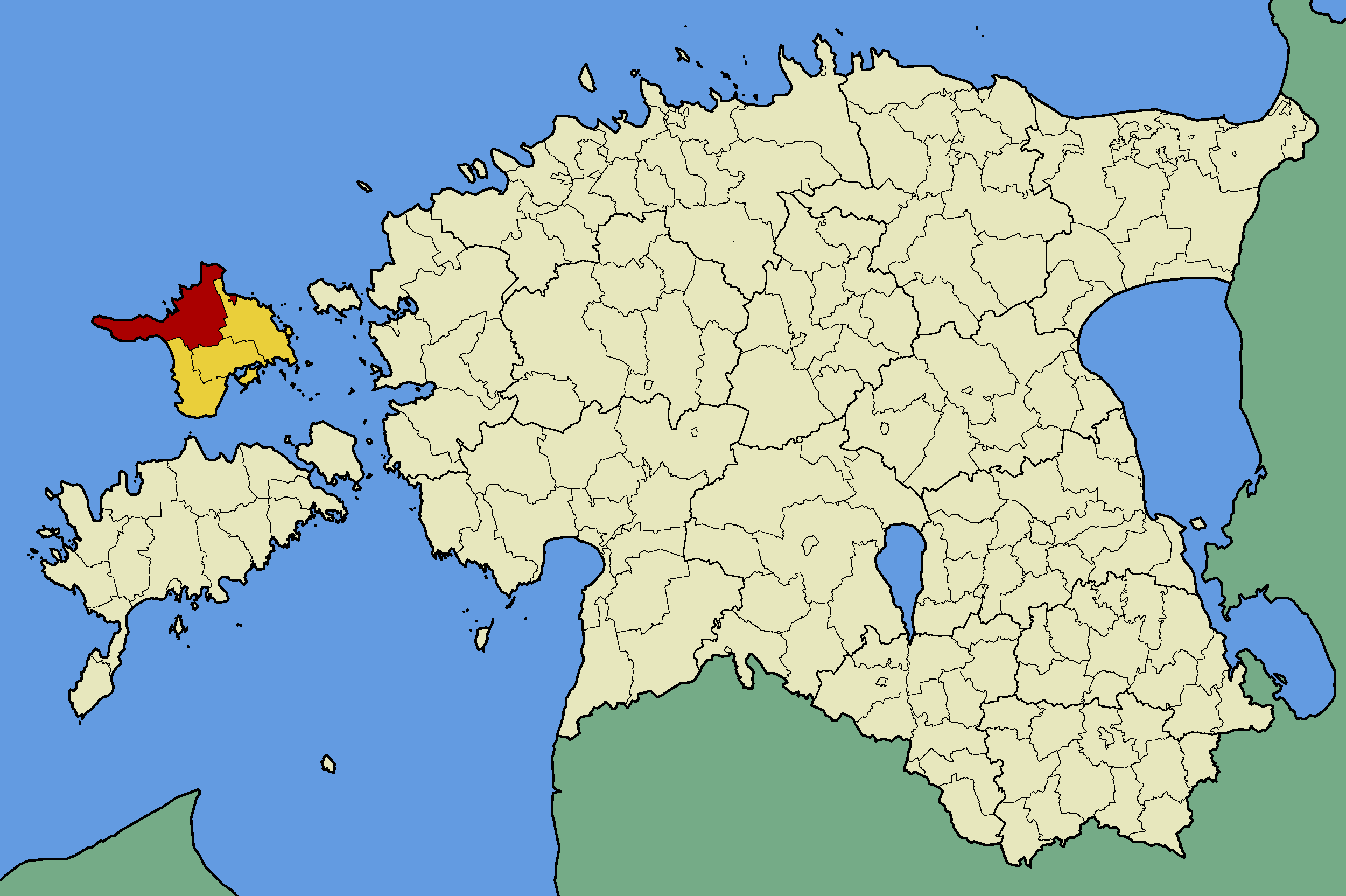
- Hiiu Parish within Hiiu County.
- Country: Estonia
- County: Hiiu County
- Administrative centre: Kärdla

Government
  - Mayor: Reili Rand (SDE)

Area
  - Total: 388 km^{2} (150 sq mi)

Population (26.06.2013)
  - Total: ca 5,000
- Website: www.hiiuvald.ee

Hiiu Parish (Estonian: Hiiu vald) was a rural municipality of Hiiu County, Estonia. It occupied the northwestern part of the Hiiumaa island. The population was about 5000 (as of 26 June 2013), about 3600 of whom lived in the parish seat.

Hiiu Parish was established by merging the town of Kärdla (former urban municipality) and Kõrgessaare Parish after the municipal elections held on 20 October 2013. Kärdla was non-contiguous with the rest of the municipality.

== Populated places ==
Hiiu Parish had a town Kärdla, a small borough (alevik) Kõrgessaare and 58 villages: Heigi, Heiste, Heistesoo, Hirmuste, Hüti, Isabella, Jõeranna, Jõesuu, Kalana, Kaleste, Kanapeeksi, Kauste, Kidaste, Kiduspe, Kiivera, Kodeste, Koidma, Kopa, Kõpu, Kurisu, Laasi, Lauka, Lehtma, Leigri, Lilbi, Luidja, Mägipe, Malvaste, Mangu, Mardihansu, Meelste, Metsaküla, Mudaste, Napi, Nõmme, Ogandi, Ojaküla, Otste, Palli, Paope, Pihla, Poama, Puski, Reigi, Risti, Rootsi, Sigala, Sülluste, Suurepsi, Suureranna, Tahkuna, Tammistu, Tiharu, Ülendi, Viita, Viitasoo, Vilima, Villamaa.

== Gallery ==
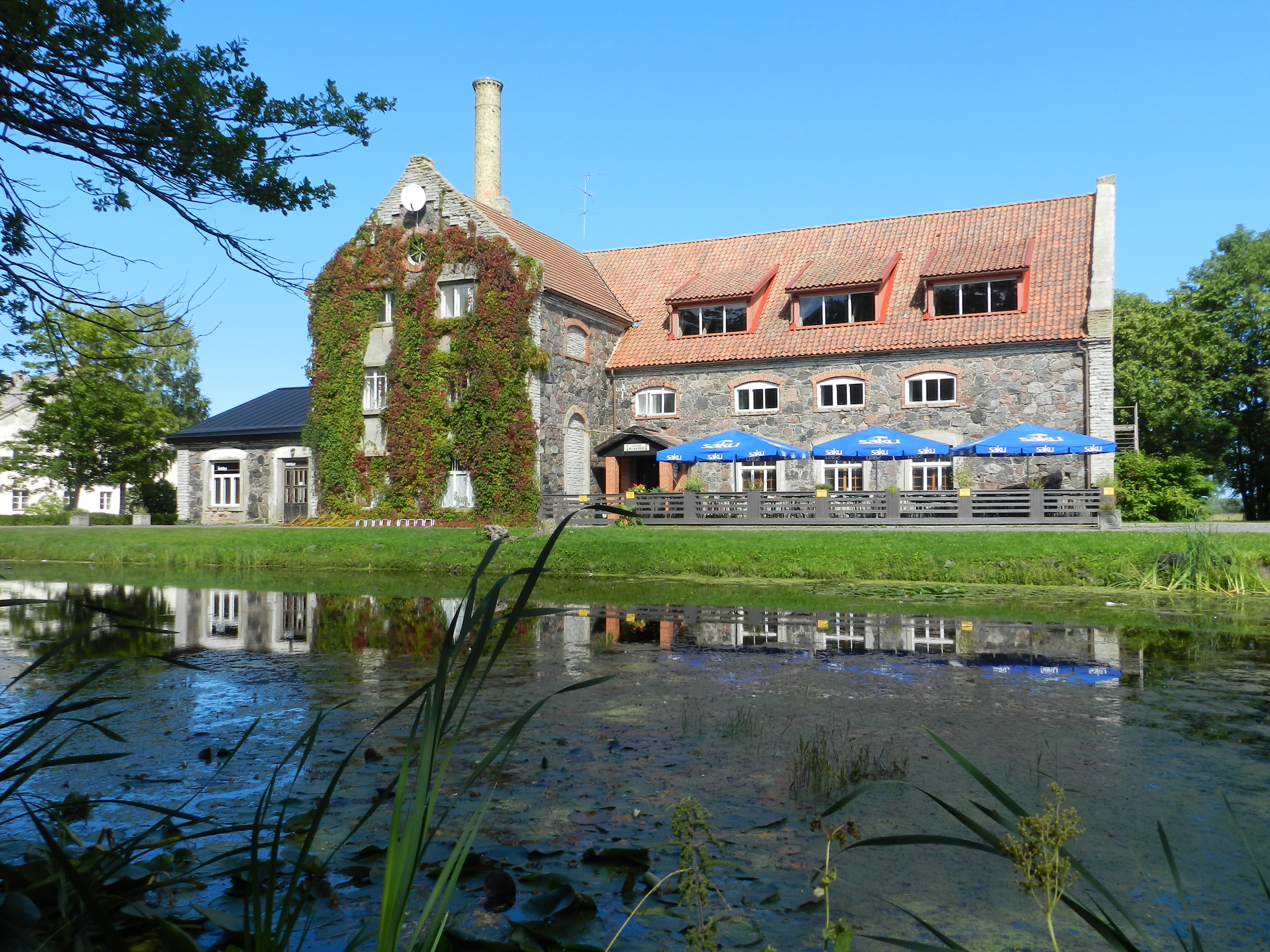
Kõrgessaare distillery

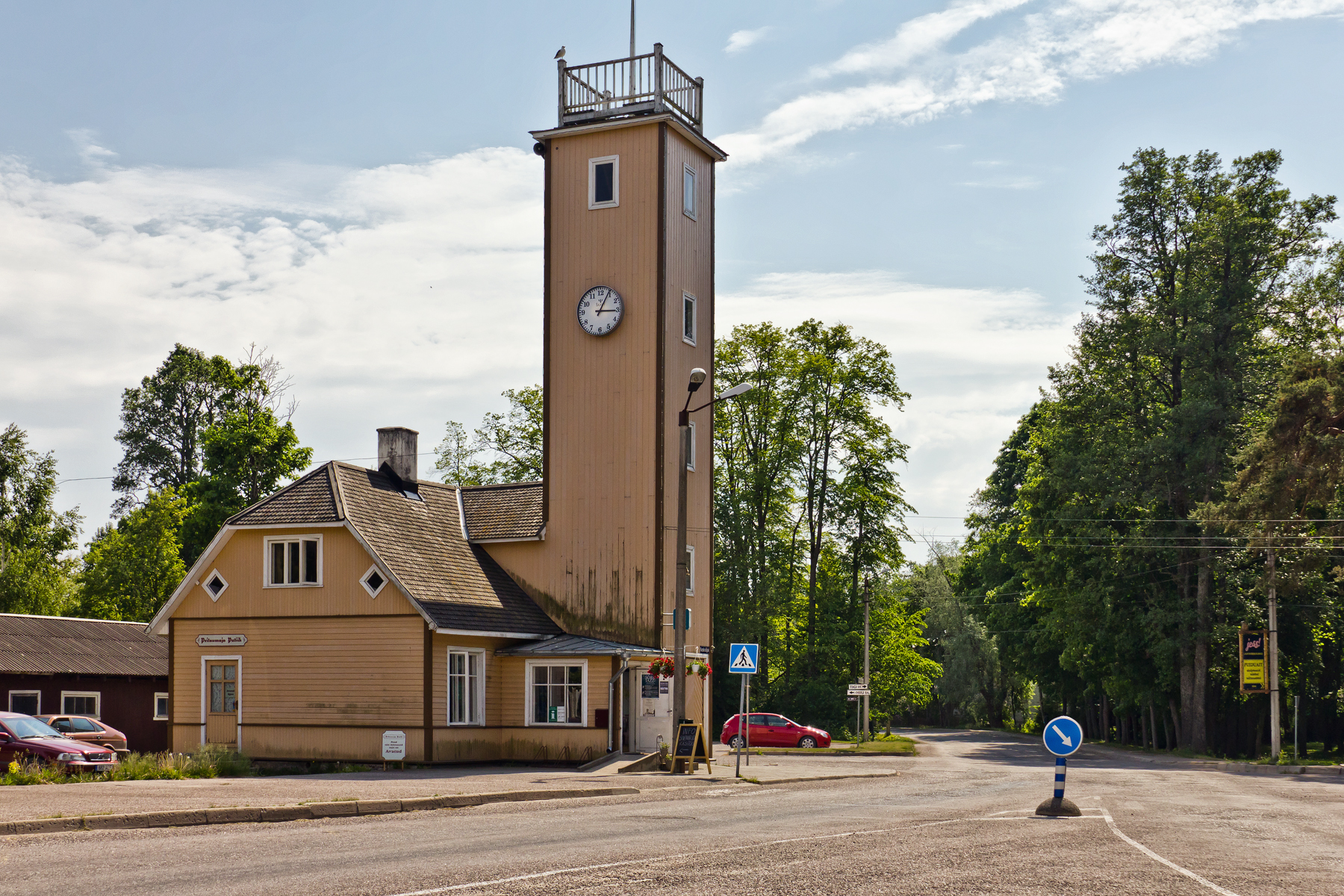
Kärdla fire station

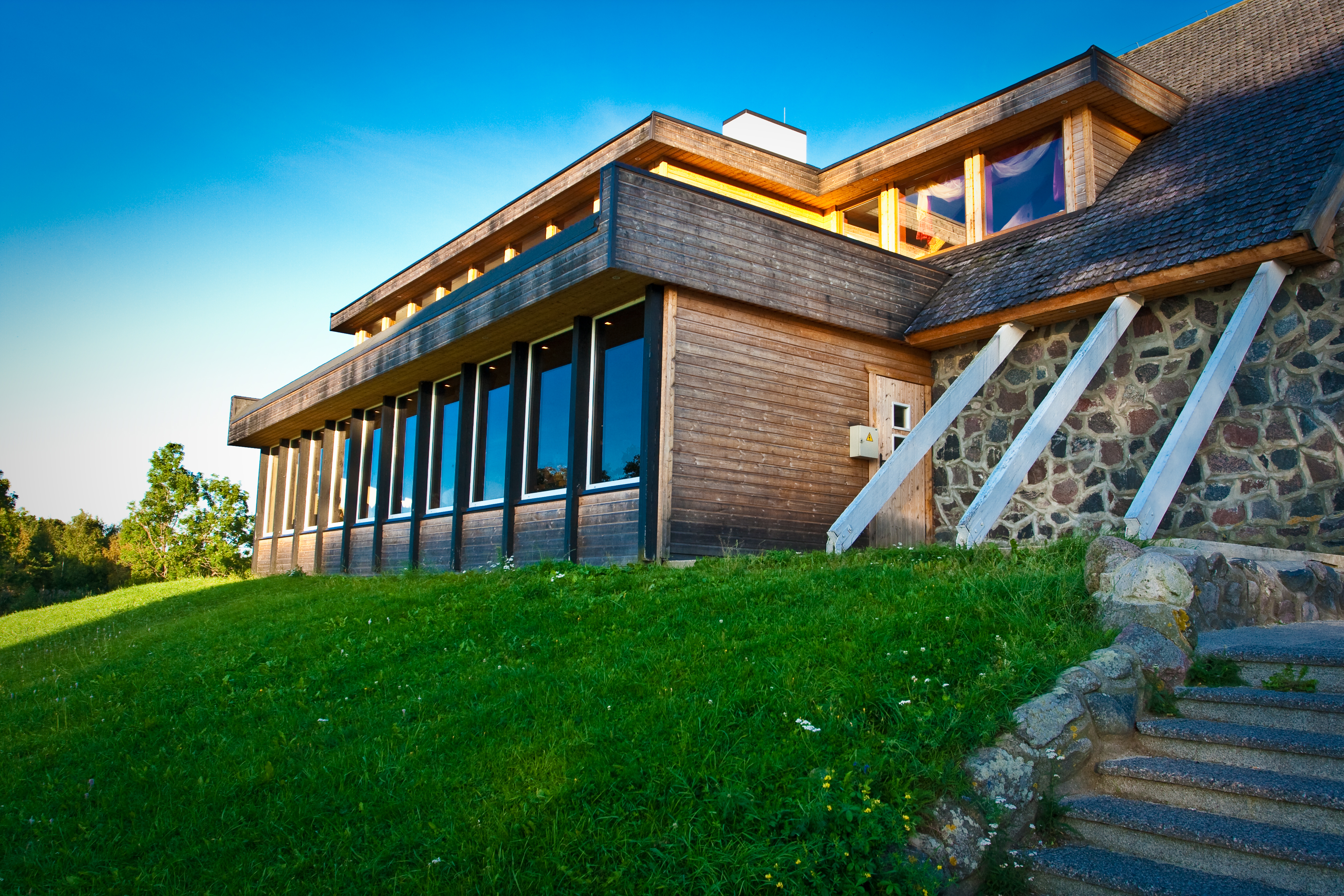
Rannapaargu restaurant in Kärdla

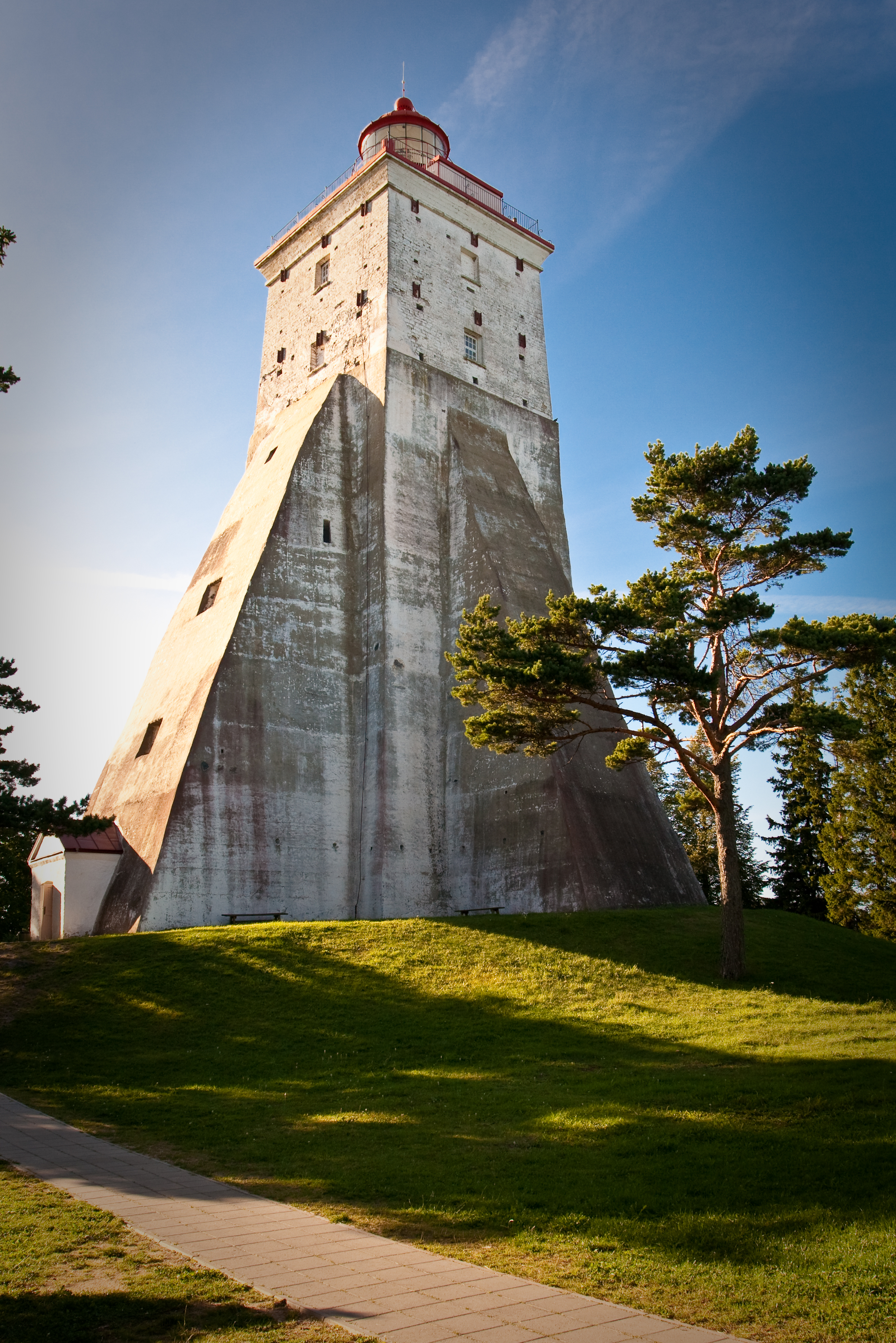
Kõpu Lighthouse

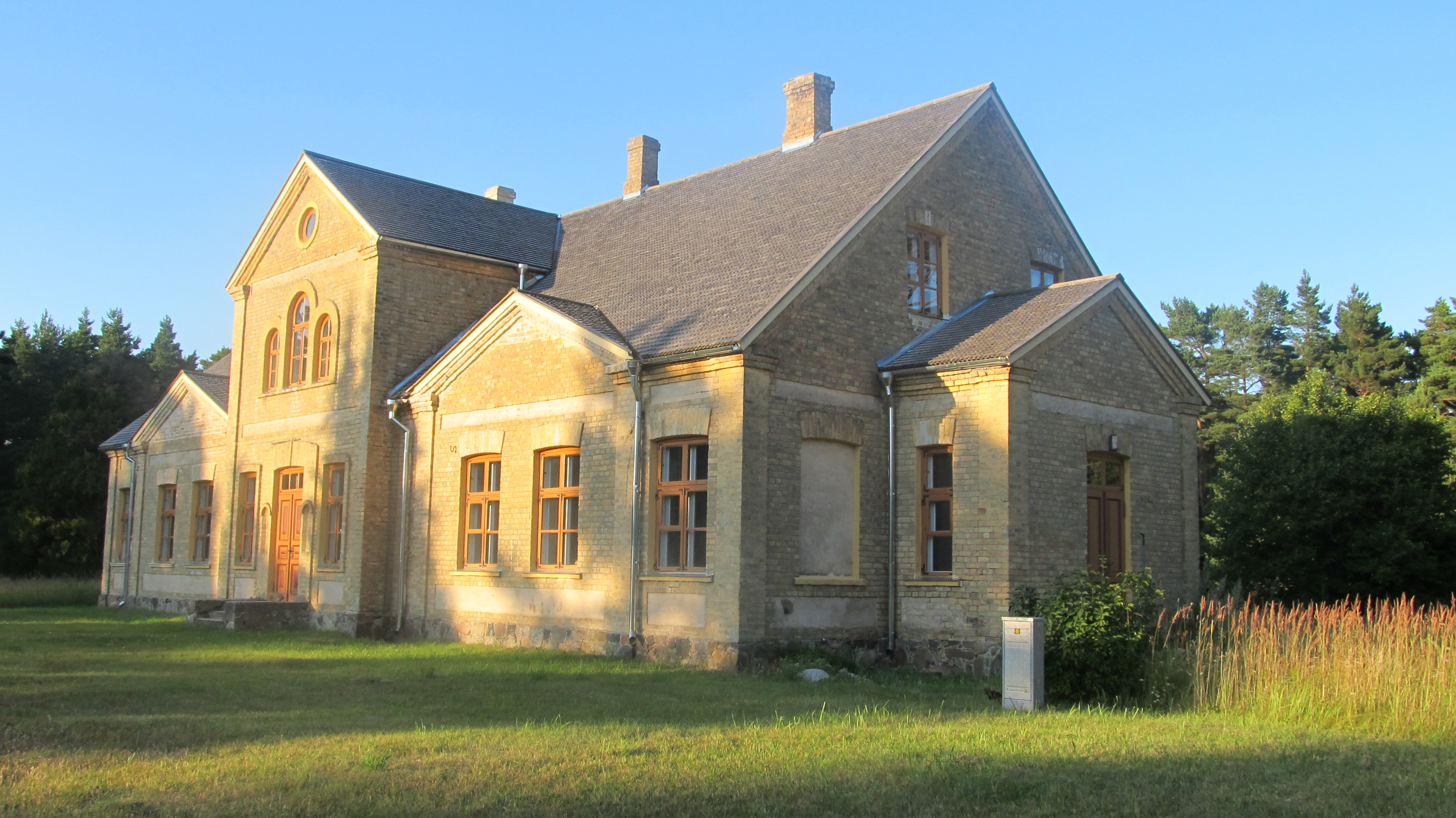
Kõpu Orthodox church-schoolhouse

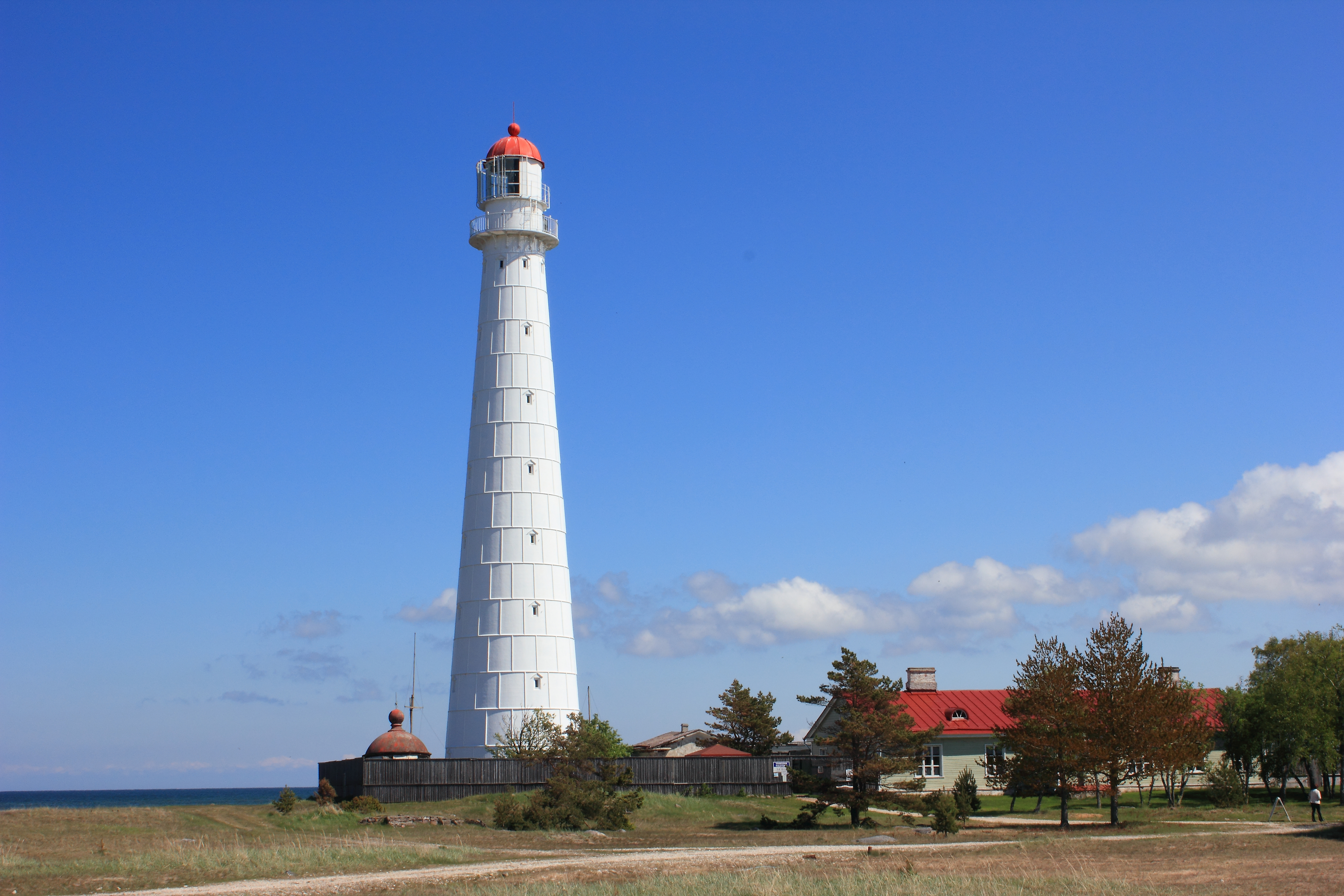
Tahkuna lighthouse

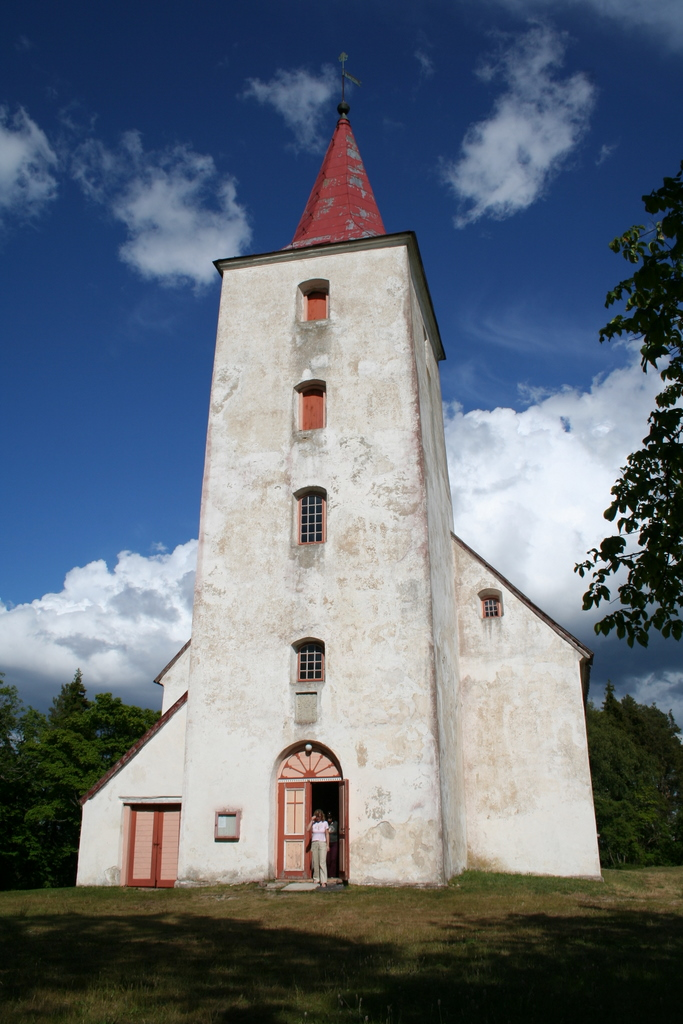
Reigi church

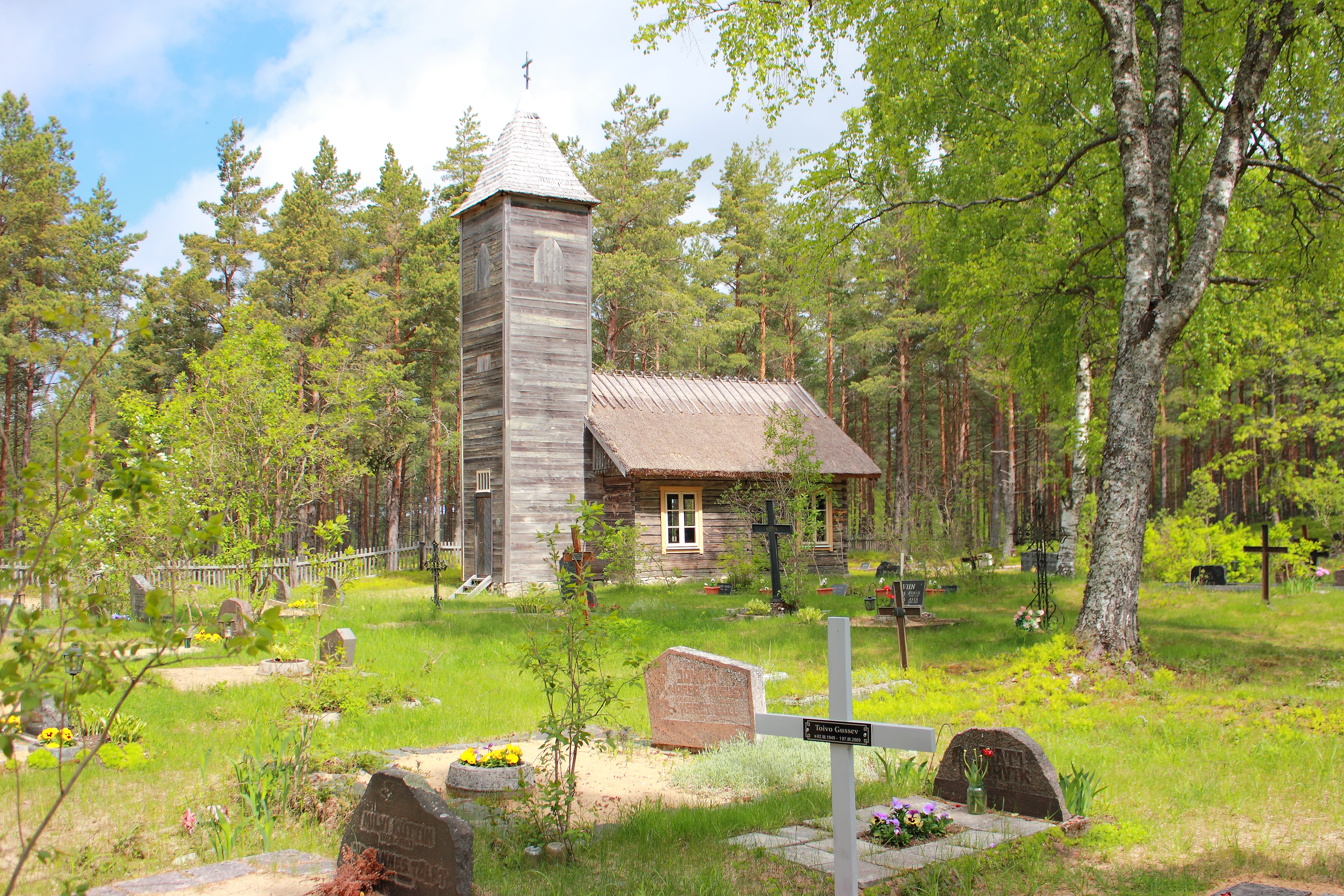
Malvaste chapel

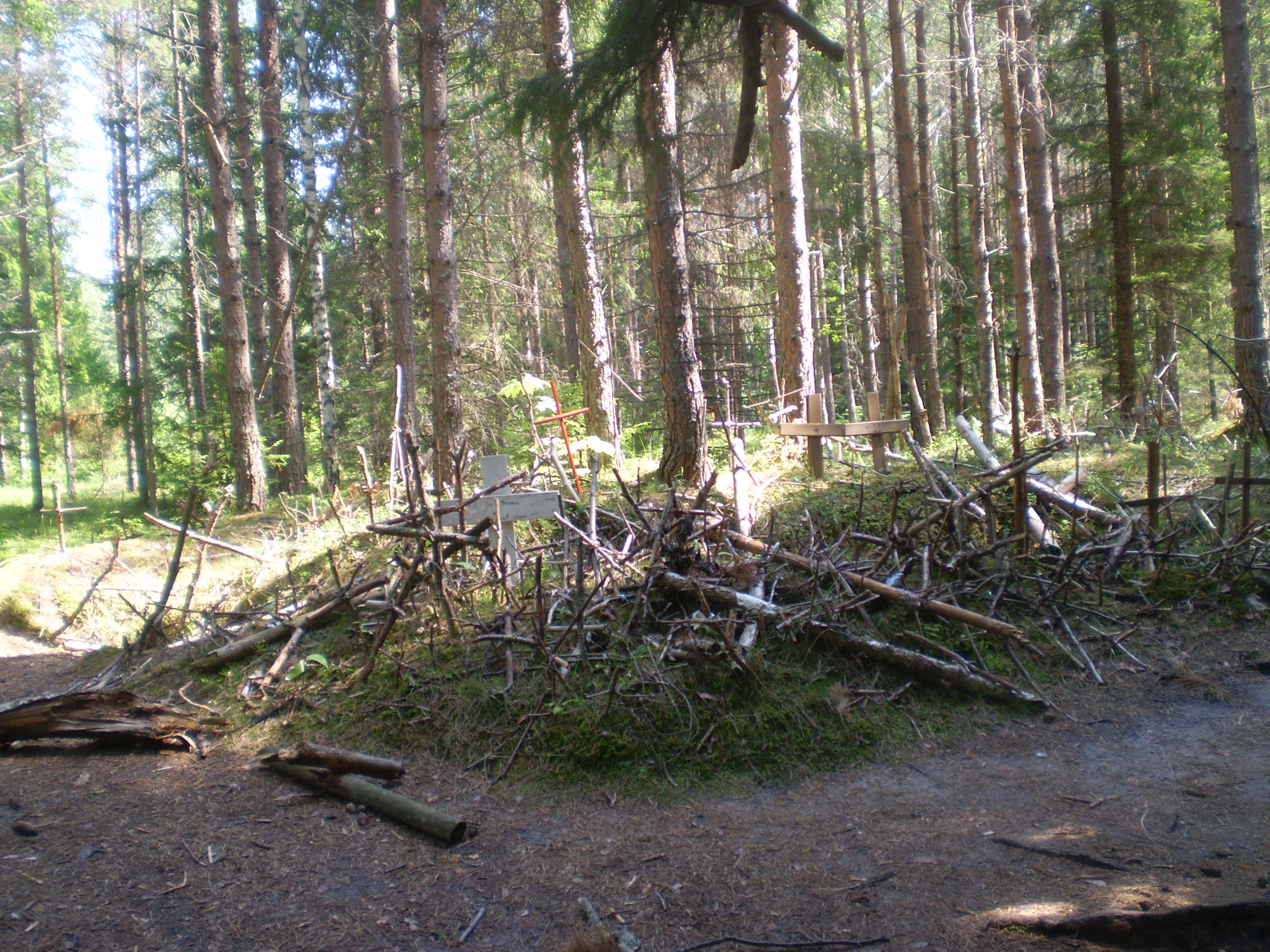
Hill of Crosses (Ristimägi) in Risti

== See also ==
- Kõpu Lighthouse
