= Kõpu Peninsula =

Peninsula in Estonia

Coordinates: 58.91°N 22.22°E

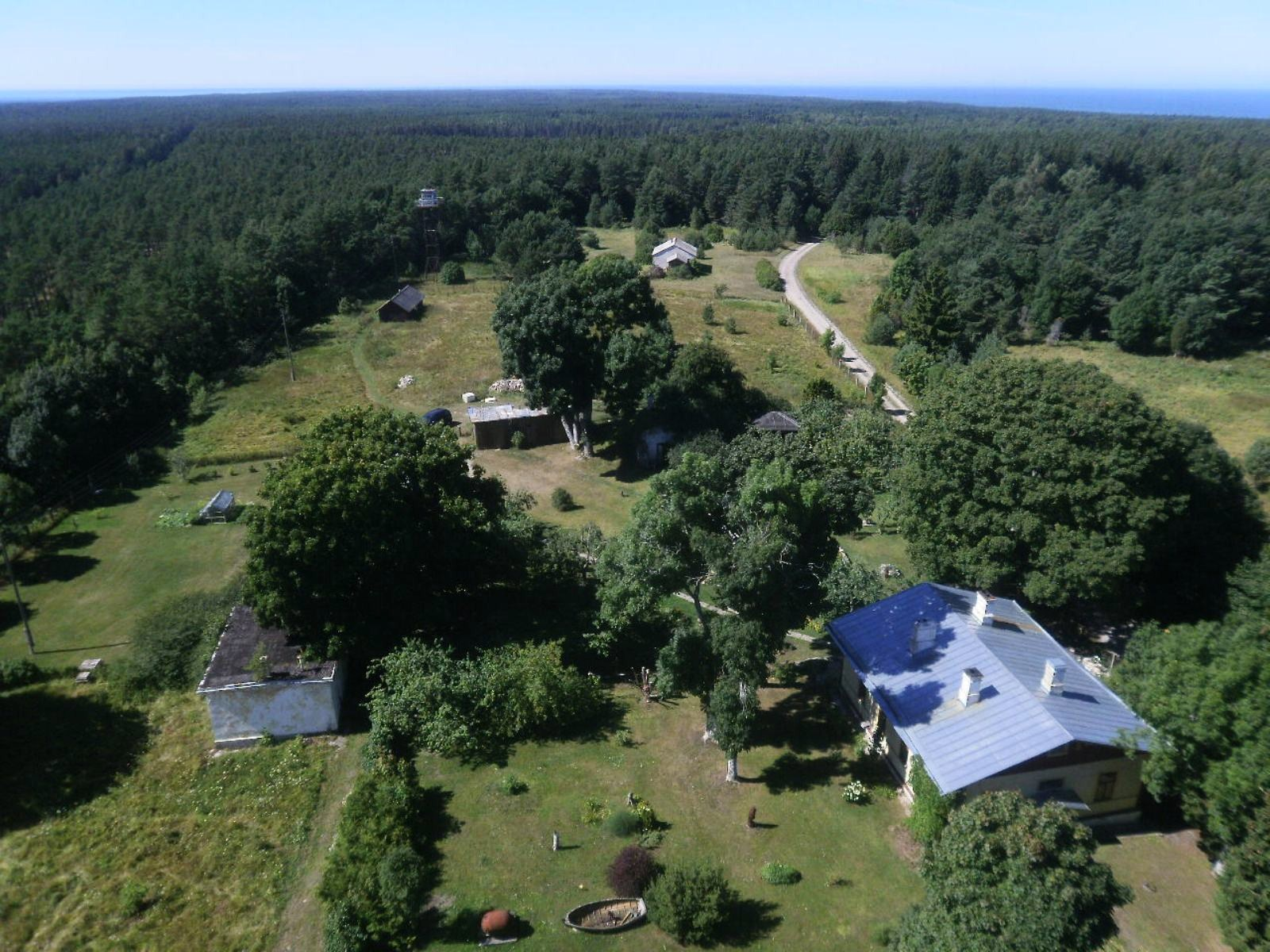
View from the Kõpu Lighthouse

The Kõpu Peninsula (Estonian: Kõpu poolsaar) is a peninsula on the island of Hiiumaa in Hiiu County, Estonia. The length of the peninsula is about 21 kilometres (13 mi).

Among the villages on the peninsula are Hirmuste, Jõesuu, Kalana, Kaleste, Kiduspe, Kõpu, Luidja, and Mägipe. Also located on the peninsula are Ristna Cape, the Kõpu Lighthouse, and the Ristna Lighthouse.

Part of the peninsula is under protection as Kõpu Nature Reserve.
