= Tahkuna Peninsula =

Peninsula in Estonia

Coordinates: 59.06°N 22.63°E

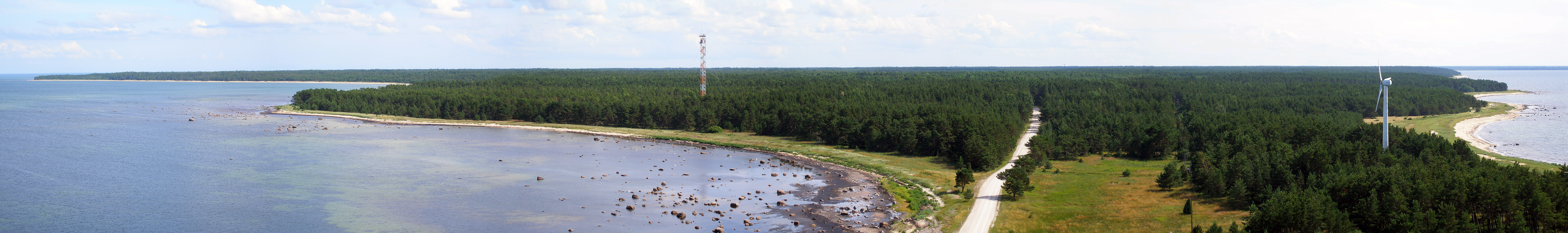
Tahkuna Peninsula seen from Tahkuna Lighthouse

Tahkuna Peninsula (Estonian: Tahkuna poolsaar) is a peninsula in Hiiu County, Estonia.

Five villages are on the peninsula—Tahkuna, Lehtma, Kodeste, Kauste and Meelste. Also located on the peninsula are Tahkuna Cape, Tahkuna Stone Labyrinth, Tahkuna Lighthouse, and Lehtma Harbor.

Part of the peninsula is under protection as Tahkuna Nature Reserve.
