= Luidja Landscape Conservation Area =

Conservation area in Estonia

- Location within Estonia
- Location: Estonia
- Coordinates: 58°56′23″N 22°24′20″E
- Area: 68 ha (170 acres)
- Established: 1962 (1997)

Luidja Landscape Conservation Area is a nature park is located in Hiiu County, Estonia.

Its area is 68 ha.

The protected area was founded in 1962 to protect the Luidja alder forest on the dunes, located in Luidja and Paope village. In 1997, the protected area was designated to the landscape conservation area.
