= Kalana Nature Reserve =

Protected area in Estonia

- Location within Estonia
- Location: Estonia
- Coordinates: 58°55′N 22°06′E
- Area: 33 ha (82 acres)
- Established: 2014

Kalana Nature Reserve is a nature reserve which is located in Hiiu County, Estonia.

The area of the nature reserve is 33 ha.

The protected area was founded in 2013 to protect valuable habitat types and threatened species in Kalana and Kaleste village (both in former Kõrgessaare Parish).
