= Kajumeri =

Lake in Estonia

- Location within Estonia Location within Europe
- Coordinates: 58°59′21″N 22°30′16″E
- Basin countries: Estonia
- Max. length: 630 meters (2,070 ft)
- Surface area: 14.9 hectares (37 acres)
- Max. depth: 1.0 meter (3 ft 3 in)
- Shore length^{1}: 2,180 meters (7,150 ft)
- Surface elevation: 0.5 meters (1 ft 8 in)
- ^{1} Shore length is not a well-defined measure.

Kajumeri is a lake in Estonia. It is located in the villages of Rootsi and Pihla in Hiiumaa Parish, Hiiu County.

== Physical description ==
The lake has an area of 14.9 hectares (37 acres) The lake has a maximum depth of 1.0 meter (3 ft 3 in). It is 630 meters (2,070 ft) long, and its shoreline measures 2,180 meters (7,150 ft).

== See also ==
- List of lakes of Estonia
