= Külalaid =

Island in Estonia

Külalaid is a small island in the Baltic Sea belonging to the country of Estonia. Its coordinates are 58°58′43″N 22°24′19″E.

Külalaid lies just off the northwestern coast of the island of Hiiumaa, as such it is administered by Hiiu County (Estonian: Hiiu maakond). It lies closest to the Paope coastal area of the island and along with Ninalaid, it is one of the larger of the tiny islets of the area.

== See also ==
- List of islands of Estonia
