= Kopa, Estonia =

Village in Estonia

Kopa
- Village
- Location in Estonia
- Coordinates: 58°55′07″N 22°24′32″E
- Country: Estonia
- County: Hiiu County
- Municipality: Hiiumaa Parish

Population (2019)
  - Total: 11

Kopa is a village in Hiiumaa Parish, Hiiu County, on the island of Hiiumaa in Estonia. It is located at the beginning of the Kõpu Peninsula, about 1.8 km (1.1 mi) southeast of Luidja. As of 2019, the village's population is 11.. As of 2011, population was 10. Before 2013, it was located in Kõrgessaare Parish.

Artist Kaljo Põllu (1934–2010) was born in Kopa.
