= List of peninsulas of Estonia =

This is list of peninsulas and capes in Estonia. The list is incomplete.

Name	Location (county, parish)	Further info	Image	Coordinates
Harilaid	Saare County, Saaremaa Parish			58°29′N 21°51′E
Juminda Peninsula	Harju County, Kuusalu Parish			
Käsmu Peninsula	Lääne-Viru County, Valjala Parish	between in Käsmu Bay and Eru Bay		
Letipea cape	Lääne-Viru County, Viru-Nigula Parish	in Estonian: Letipea neem		
Paljassaare Peninsula	Harju County, Tallinn			
Pärispea Peninsula	Harju County, Kuusalu Parish			59°39′18″N 25°40′19″E
Salinõmme Peninsula	Hiiu County, Hiiumaa Parish			
Sõrve Peninsula	Saare County, Saaremaa Parish			
Tammiski nukk	Hiiu County			
Kopli Peninsula	Harju County			
Tahkuna Peninsula	Hiiu County			
Sõrve säär	Saare County			
Kõpu Peninsula	Hiiu County			
Suurupi Peninsula	Harju County			
Noarootsi Peninsula	Lääne County			
Sõmeri Peninsula	Pärnu County			
Kakumäe Peninsula	Harju County			
Virtsu Peninsula	Lääne County, Lääneranna Parish			
Sääretirp	Hiiu County			
Sarve Peninsula	Hiiu County			
