= Kukka Nature Reserve =

Protected area in Estonia

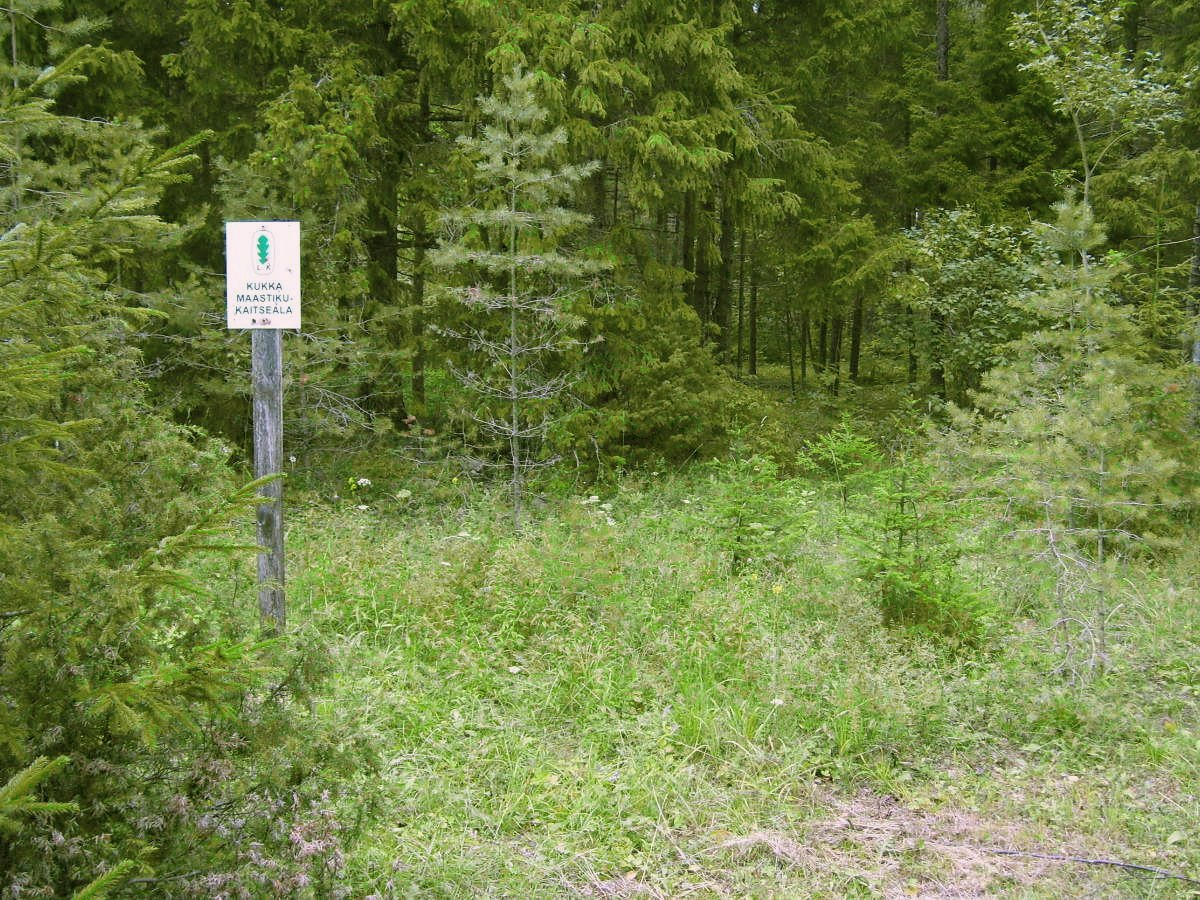
- A photo of the reserve

- Location within Estonia
- Location: Estonia
- Coordinates: 58°58′N 22°52′E
- Area: 169 ha (420 acres)
- Established: 1998 (2017)

Kukka Nature Reserve is a nature reserve which is located in Hiiu County, Estonia.

The area of the nature reserve is 169 ha.

The protected area was founded in 1998 on the basis of Kukka Landscape Conservation Area.
