= Ninalaid =

Island in Estonia

Ninalaid is a small Baltic Sea island belonging to the country of Estonia. Its coordinates are 58°59′52″N 22°26′31″E.

Ninalaid lies just off the northwestern coast of the island of Hiiumaa, as such it is administered by Hiiu County (Estonian: Hiiu maakond). It lies closest to the Paope coastal area of the island near the small island of Külalaid.

== See also ==
- List of islands of Estonia
