= Kõrgessaare Parish =

Former municipality of Estonia

Coordinates: 58°57′N 22°28′E

Kõrgessaare Parish Kõrgessaare vald
- Former municipality of Estonia
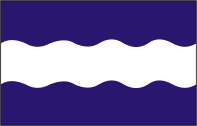
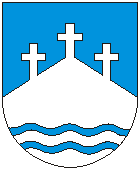
- Flag Coat of arms

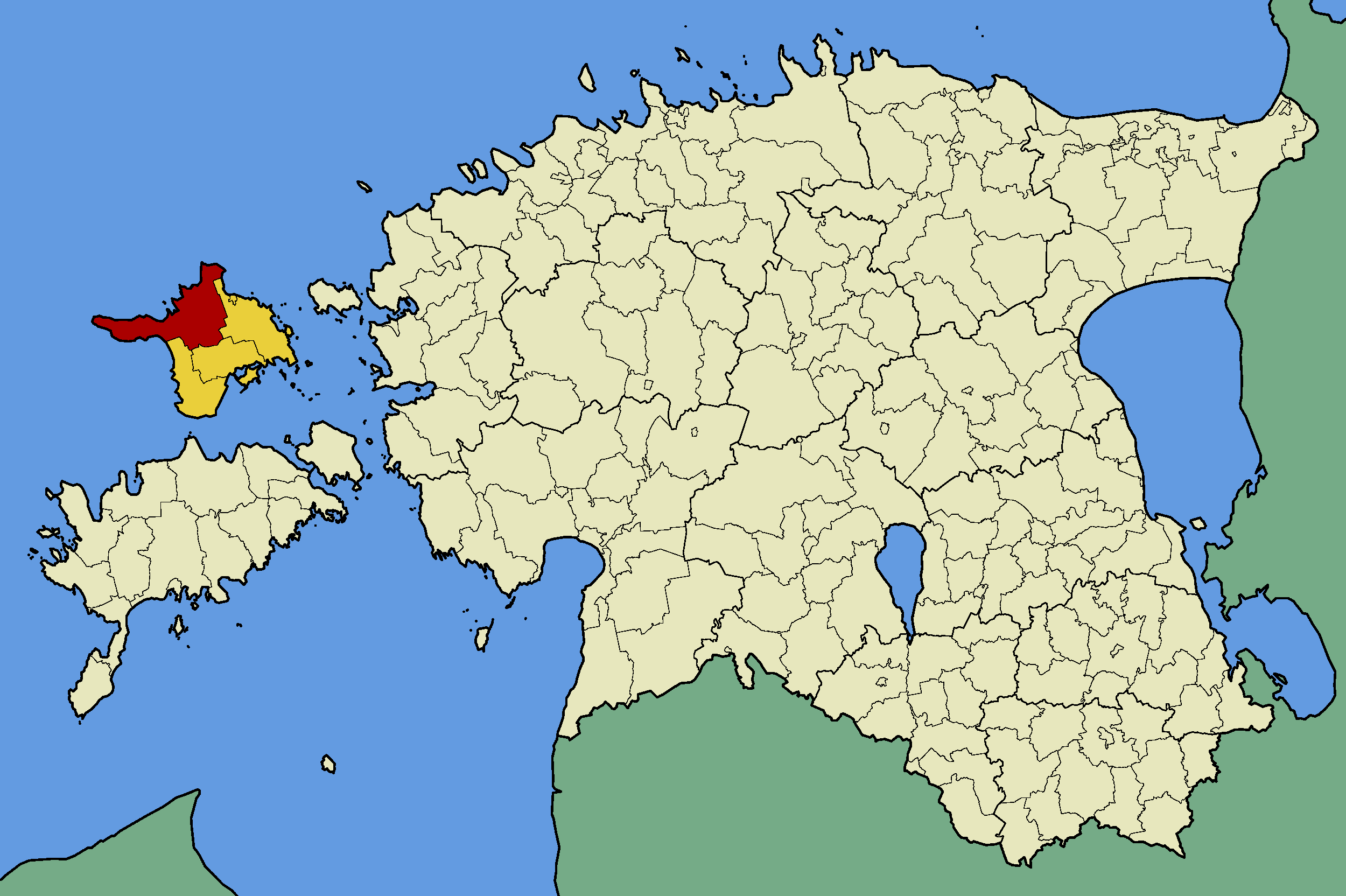
- Kõrgessaare Parish within Hiiu County in 2009.
- Country: Estonia
- County: Hiiu County
- Administrative centre: Kõrgessaare

Area
  - Total: 379.5 km^{2} (146.5 sq mi)

Population (01.01.2006)
  - Total: 1,329
  - Density: 3.502/km^{2} (9.070/sq mi)
- Website: www.korgessaare.ee

Kõrgessaare Parish (Estonian: Kõrgessaare vald) was a rural municipality in the north-west of Hiiu County, Estonia. In 2013 it was merged with the town of Kärdla to form a new Hiiu Parish.

== Settlements ==
There was 1 small borough (alevik) Kõrgessaare and 58 villages: Heigi, Heiste, Heistesoo, Hirmuste, Hüti, Isabella, Jõeranna, Jõesuu, Kalana, Kaleste, Kanapeeksi, Kauste, Kidaste, Kiduspe, Kiivera, Kodeste, Koidma, Kopa, Kõpu, Kurisu, Laasi, Lauka, Lehtma, Leigri, Lilbi, Luidja, Mägipe, Malvaste, Mangu, Mardihansu, Meelste, Metsaküla, Mudaste, Napi, Nõmme, Ogandi, Ojaküla, Otste, Palli, Paope, Pihla, Poama, Puski, Reigi, Risti, Rootsi, Sigala, Sülluste, Suurepsi, Suureranna, Tahkuna, Tammistu, Tiharu, Ülendi, Viita, Viitasoo, Vilima, Villamaa.
