= Heigi =

Village in Estonia

- Village
- Location within Estonia
- Coordinates: 58°58′N 22°33′E
- Country: Estonia
- County: Hiiu County
- Parish: Hiiumaa Parish
- Time zone: UTC+2 (EET)
  - Summer (DST): UTC+3 (EEST)

Heigi is a village in Hiiumaa Parish, Hiiu County in northwestern Estonia.

The village was first mentioned in 1688 (Heike, or Heicke, or Heiki). Historically, the village was part of Lauka Manor (German: Lauk). Before 2013, it was located in Kõrgessaare Parish.

From 1977 to 1997, Heigi was part of the village of Kurisu.
