= Heistesoo =

Village in Estonia

- Village
- Location within Estonia
- Coordinates: 58°56′N 22°17′E
- Country: Estonia
- County: Hiiu County
- Parish: Hiiumaa Parish
- Time zone: UTC+2 (EET)
  - Summer (DST): UTC+3 (EEST)

Heistesoo is a village in Hiiumaa Parish, Hiiu County in northwestern Estonia.

The village was first mentioned in about 1900 (Хейстесоо). Historically, the village was part of Kõrgessaare Manor (German: Hohenholm).

After the 1940s, the village was merged with the village of Suureranna, but in 1997 the village of Heistesoo was restored. Before 2013, it was located in Kõrgessaare Parish.
