= Lilbi =

Lilbi may refer to:

- Lilbi, Hiiu County, village in Estonia
- Lilbi, Saare County, village in Estonia
