= Kanapeeksi =

Village in Estonia

- Village
- Location within Estonia
- Coordinates: 58°59′36″N 22°28′29″E
- Country: Estonia
- County: Hiiu County
- Parish: Hiiumaa Parish
- Time zone: UTC+2 (EET)
  - Summer (DST): UTC+3 (EEST)

Kanapeeksi is a village in Hiiumaa Parish, Hiiu County in northwestern Estonia.

The village was first mentioned in 1922 (Kanapuksi, or Kanapsi). Historically, the areas of village were part of Kõrgessaare Manor (German: Hohenholm).

After 1940s the village was merged into Koidma, but in 1997 Kanapeeksi's village status was restored. Before 2013, it was located in Kõrgessaare Parish.
