= Kauste =

Village in Estonia

- Village
- Location within Estonia
- Coordinates: 59°02′N 22°36′E
- Country: Estonia
- County: Hiiu County
- Parish: Hiiumaa Parish
- Time zone: UTC+2 (EET)
  - Summer (DST): UTC+3 (EEST)

Kauste is a village in Hiiumaa Parish, Hiiu County in northwestern Estonia.

The village was first mentioned in 1565 (Kowstha). Historically, the village was part of Kõrgessaare Manor (German: Hohenholm).

From 1977 to 1997, Kauste was part of the village of Malvaste. Before 2013, it was located in Kõrgessaare Parish.
