= Puski =

Village in Estonia

- Village
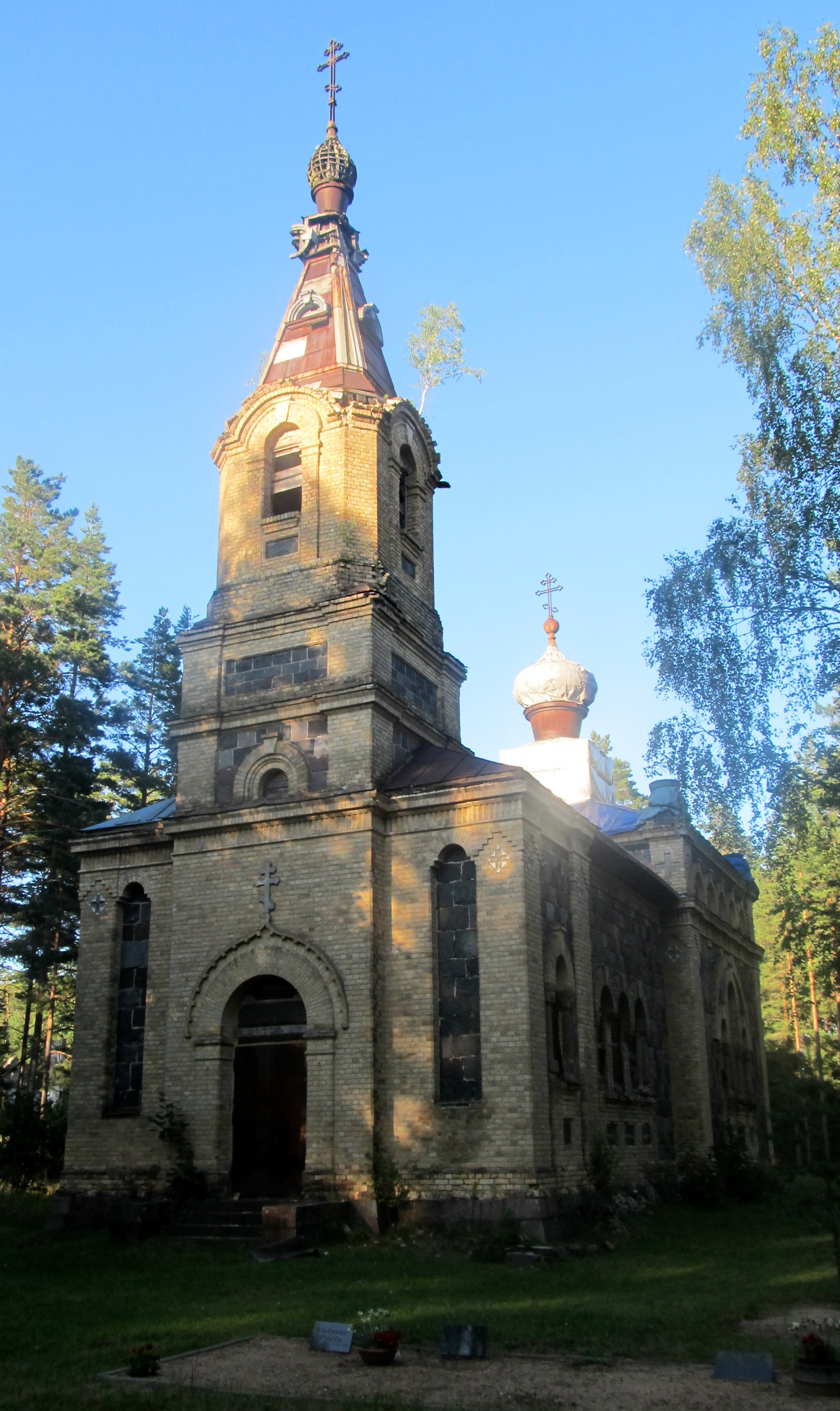
- Puski Orthodox church

- Location within Estonia
- Coordinates: 58°55′N 22°26′E
- Country: Estonia
- County: Hiiu County
- Parish: Hiiumaa Parish
- Time zone: UTC+2 (EET)
  - Summer (DST): UTC+3 (EEST)

Puski is a village in Hiiumaa Parish, Hiiu County, on the island of Hiiumaa, Estonia. Before 2013, it was located in Kõrgessaare Parish.
