= Reigi-Nõmme =

Village in Estonia

- Village
- Location within Estonia
- Coordinates: 58°54′N 22°24′E
- Country: Estonia
- County: Hiiu County
- Parish: Hiiumaa Parish
- Time zone: UTC+2 (EET)
  - Summer (DST): UTC+3 (EEST)

Reigi-Nõmme (Nõmme until 2017) is a village in Hiiumaa Parish, Hiiu County in northwestern Estonia. As of 2011, the population in Reigi-Nõmme is 2. This is the same as it was in the year 2000. Before 2013, it was located in Kõrgessaare Parish.
