= Palli, Hiiu County =

Village in Estonia

Palli
- Village
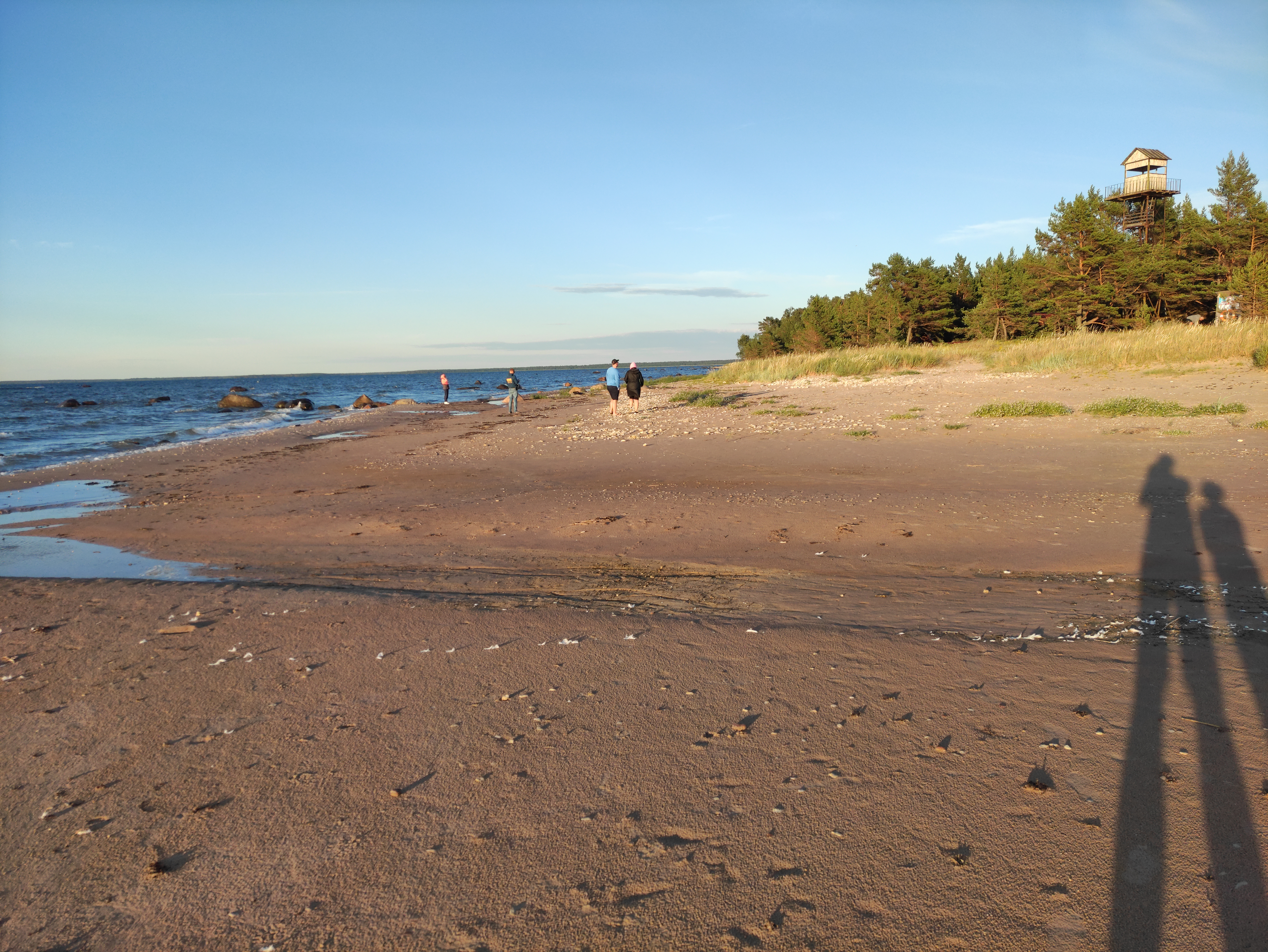
- Palli beach and observation tower

- Location within Estonia
- Coordinates: 58°56′26″N 22°19′12″E
- Country: Estonia
- County: Hiiu County
- Parish: Hiiumaa Parish
- Time zone: UTC+2 (EET)
  - Summer (DST): UTC+3 (EEST)

Palli is a village in Hiiumaa Parish, Hiiu County, on the island of Hiiumaa, Estonia. Before 2013, it was located in Kõrgessaare Parish.
