= Kaljo Põllu =

Estonian artist

Kaljo Põllu (28 November 1934 in Kopa, Hiiumaa – 23 March 2010) was an Estonian artist. In 1962 he received a diploma in glass art, and became director of art cabinet of Tartu State University; he founded the contemporary artist's group Visarid in 1966 in Tartu. In 1973 he moved to Tallinn, where from 1975 to 1996 he taught drawing in the Estonian Academy of Arts; at this point his art changed in style dramatically as he searched for influences from ancient Finno-Ugric culture.

In 2007 the University of Tartu gave Põllu their "Contribution to Estonian National Identity" award.

== Creative career ==
- 1959–1962 first independently created graphic and painting works during studies in the art academy

=== Tartu period ===
- 1962–1975 graphic works on impressions from travels in Estonia, Koola peninsula and Transcaucasia
- 1963–1972 abstract, pop-like and op-like graphic artwork and paintings
- 1967–1972 establishing and directing the artistic group "Visarid"
- 1973–1975 collection "Kodalased" ("People at Home") of mezzotinto graphic works (25 works)

=== Tallinn period ===
- 1978–1984 collection "Kalivägi" ("Kali People") of mezzotinto graphic works (65 works)
- 1987–1991 collection "Taevas ja maa" ("Heaven and Earth") of mezzotinto graphic works (40 works)
- 1991–1995 collection "Kirgastumine" ("Enlightenment") of mezzotinto graphic works (47 works)
- 1994–2008 created more than 100 paintings on figurative impossibleness and seemingly three-dimensionality
- 1998–2003 establishing and directing the artistic group "YDI"

== Personal exhibitions outside Estonia (selection; all graphics exhibitions) ==
- 1972 exhibition of ex libris by Kaljo Põllu in Frederikshavn (Denmark)
- 1972 exhibition of graphics together with Allex Kütt in the central exhibition hall of all-Soviet Artists Union (25 Gorki Str., Moscow)
- 1984 exhibitions in the library of Helsinki University (Finland) and in Stavanger (Norway)
- 1985 exhibition in Jyväskylä (Finland)
- 1986 exhibition in Södertäle Art Hall (Sweden)
- 1987 exhibitions in Kymenlaakso (Finland); in Göteborg Art Museum, Västerbotten and in Örebro (Sweden)
- 1989 exhibition in Alta (Norway)
- 1990 exhibitions in Suomi Gallery and in Folkens Museum (both in Stockholm, Sweden); in Nordic House (Reykjavik, Iceland); during the VII International Fenno-Ugric Congress in Debrecen (Hungary)
- 1991 exhibitions in Oulu town library and in the art gallery "Pinacotheca" of Jyväskylä University (Finland); in Szombathelys (Hungary)
- 1992 exhibitions in Qaqortoq (Greenland/Denmark); in Seattle and Hancock-Michigan (USA); in Sorbonne Centre of Paris University (France)
- 1993 exhibition in Palm Beach Community College Florida (USA)
- 1994 exhibitions in Grazi Minorite Monastery (Austria), in Kammel Dok architecture centre (Copenhagen, Denmark)
- 1995 exhibitions in Finnish embassy in Paris (France), in Museum für Völkerkunde (Wien, Austria), during the VII International Fenno-Ugric Congress in Jyväskylä (Finland), in Barcelona University (Spain)
- 1996 exhibition in Sevilla and Salamanca University (Spain)
- 2001 exhibition in Budapest (Hungary)
- 2002 exhibition in Dublin National Theatre (Ireland)

== Exhibition catalogues published outside Estonia about Kaljo Põllu ==
- Rödel, Klaus (1972), Kaljo Pöllu. Exlibrisportret 10, Frederikshavn (Denmark)
- Bernshtein, B. (1972), Алекс Кютт, Кальё Пыллу. Каталог выставки [Aleks Kütt, Kaljo Põllu. Catalogue of the exhibition], Moscow
- Farbregd, Turid (1982), Barn av vind og vatn [Born from wind and water]. Grafikk: Kaljo Põllu, Tekst: Jaan Kaplinski, Stavanger (Norway)
- Olt, Harry; Rapp, Birgitta (1986), Barn av vind och vatten [Born from wind and water], Södertälje (Sweden)
- Kaljo Põllu. Eesti. Grafiikkaa 1973–1988, Oulun Kaupunginkirjasto, 1991
- Kaljo Pöllu. Anorrip immallu meerai, Qaqortoq (Greenland/Denmark), 1992
- Lena Eriksson. Kaljo Põllu. "Barn av vind och vatten". Stockholms länsmusem, (Sweden): Länskonstmuseet, 1994

There have been published approx. 30 titles on Kaljo Põllu's artwork in newspapers and journals outside Estonia.
