= Isabella, Estonia =

Village in Estonia

Isabella
- Village
- Location within Estonia
- Coordinates: 58°57′N 22°32′E
- Country: Estonia
- County: Hiiu County
- Parish: Hiiumaa Parish
- Time zone: UTC+2 (EET)
  - Summer (DST): UTC+3 (EEST)

Isabella is a village in Hiiumaa Parish, Hiiu County, on the island of Hiiumaa, Estonia.

The village was first mentioned in 1565 (Isapalo by). Historically, the village was part of Kõrgessaare Manor (German: Hohenholm), and Lauka Manor (German: Lauk). Before 2013, it was located in Kõrgessaare Parish.
