= Jõeranna =

Village in Estonia

- Village
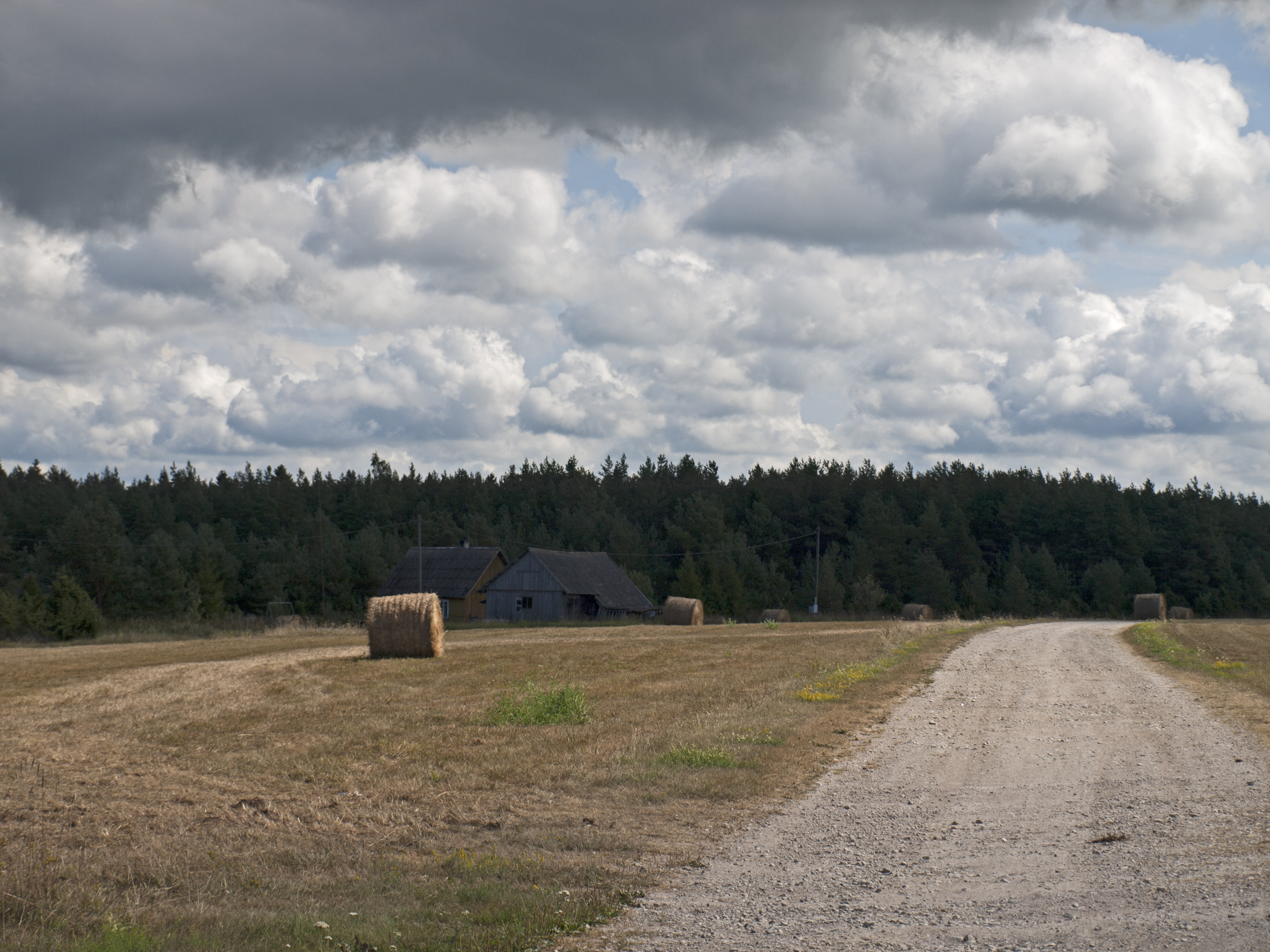

- Location within Estonia
- Coordinates: 58°57′N 22°29′E
- Country: Estonia
- County: Hiiu County
- Parish: Hiiumaa Parish
- Time zone: UTC+2 (EET)
  - Summer (DST): UTC+3 (EEST)

Jõeranna is a village in Hiiumaa Parish, Hiiu County in northwestern Estonia.

The village was first mentioned in about 1913 (Іоэранна). Historically, the village was part of Kõrgessaare Manor (German: Hohenholm).

The village is located on Jõesuu Bay. At the village, Allikoja Creek and Jõeranna Creek flow into the bay. Before 2013, it was located in Kõrgessaare Parish.
