= Suursadam =

Harbour in Estonia

Coordinates: 58°58′35″N 22°54′30″E

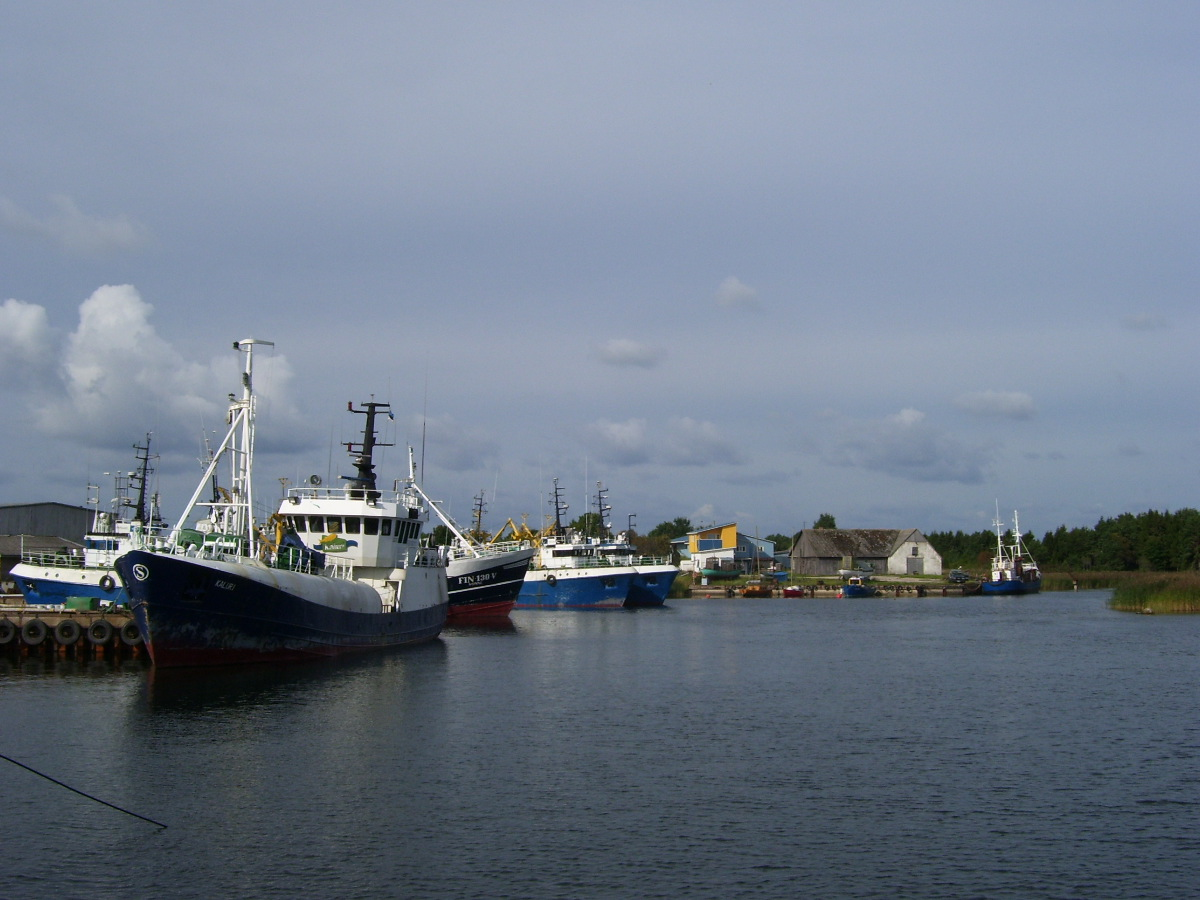
Suursadam

Suursadam ('Big harbour'), or Suursadam Harbour, is a harbour on the Estonian island of Hiiumaa, near Kärdla. Formerly, it was the most important harbour on Hiiumaa.

In the Middle Ages, lime was burned and ships were built there. Lime was an important export article.

In 1848 a famous ship, the barque Hioma, was built there. This ship, which was sailed even on the seas of the Southern Hemisphere, belonged to the Baltic German nobleman Heinrich Georg Eduard von Ungern Sternberg.
