= Pihla =

Village in Estonia

- Village
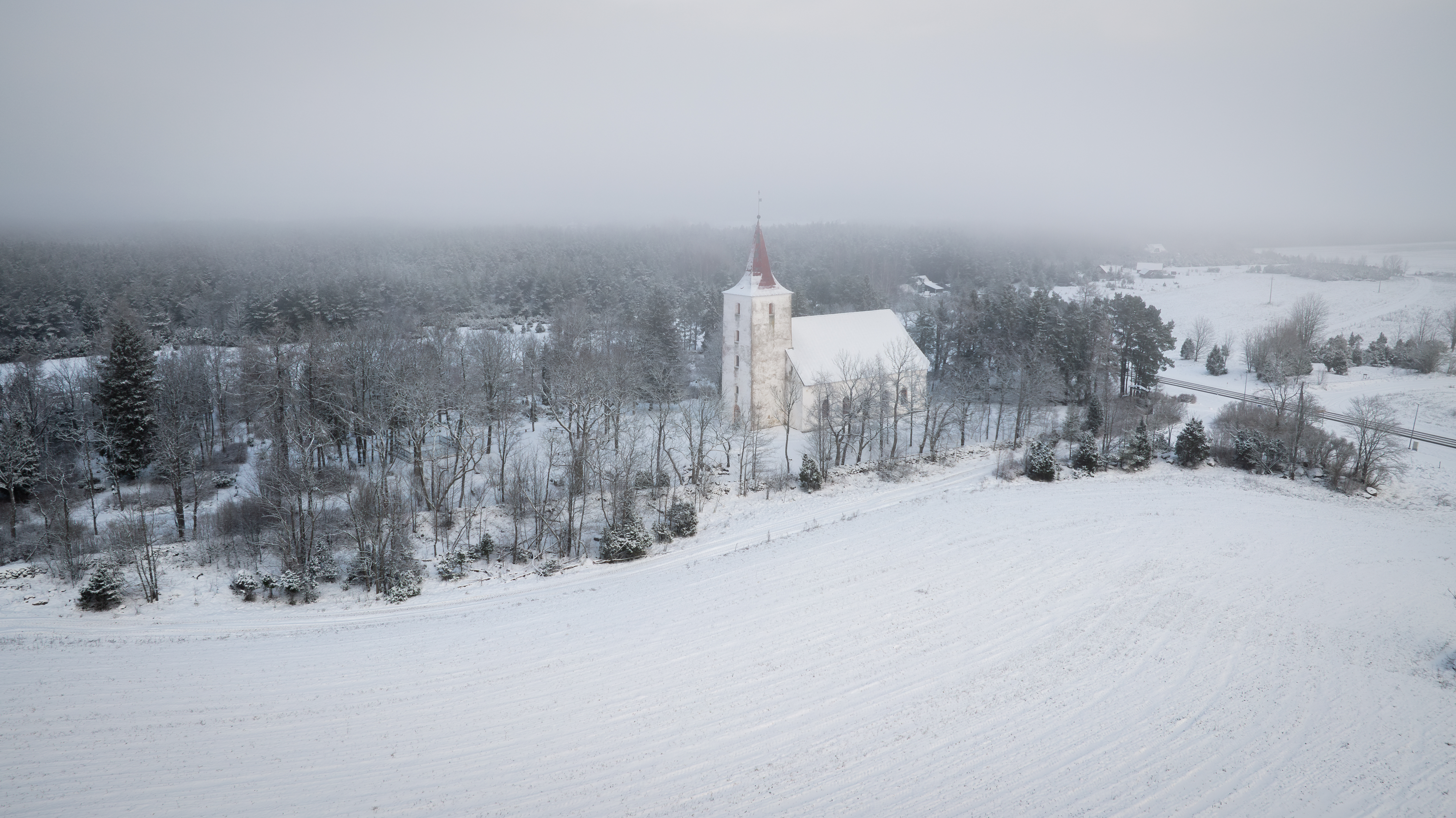
- A churchyard in Pihla

- Location within Estonia
- Coordinates: 58°59′N 22°32′E
- Country: Estonia
- County: Hiiu County
- Parish: Hiiumaa Parish
- Time zone: UTC+2 (EET)
  - Summer (DST): UTC+3 (EEST)

Pihla is a village in Hiiumaa Parish, Hiiu County in northwestern Estonia. Before 2013, it was located in Kõrgessaare Parish.

== Culture ==
The Haava windmill, Reigi Cemetry and Church are all located in the village of Pihla.
