= Mägipe =

Village in Estonia

- Village
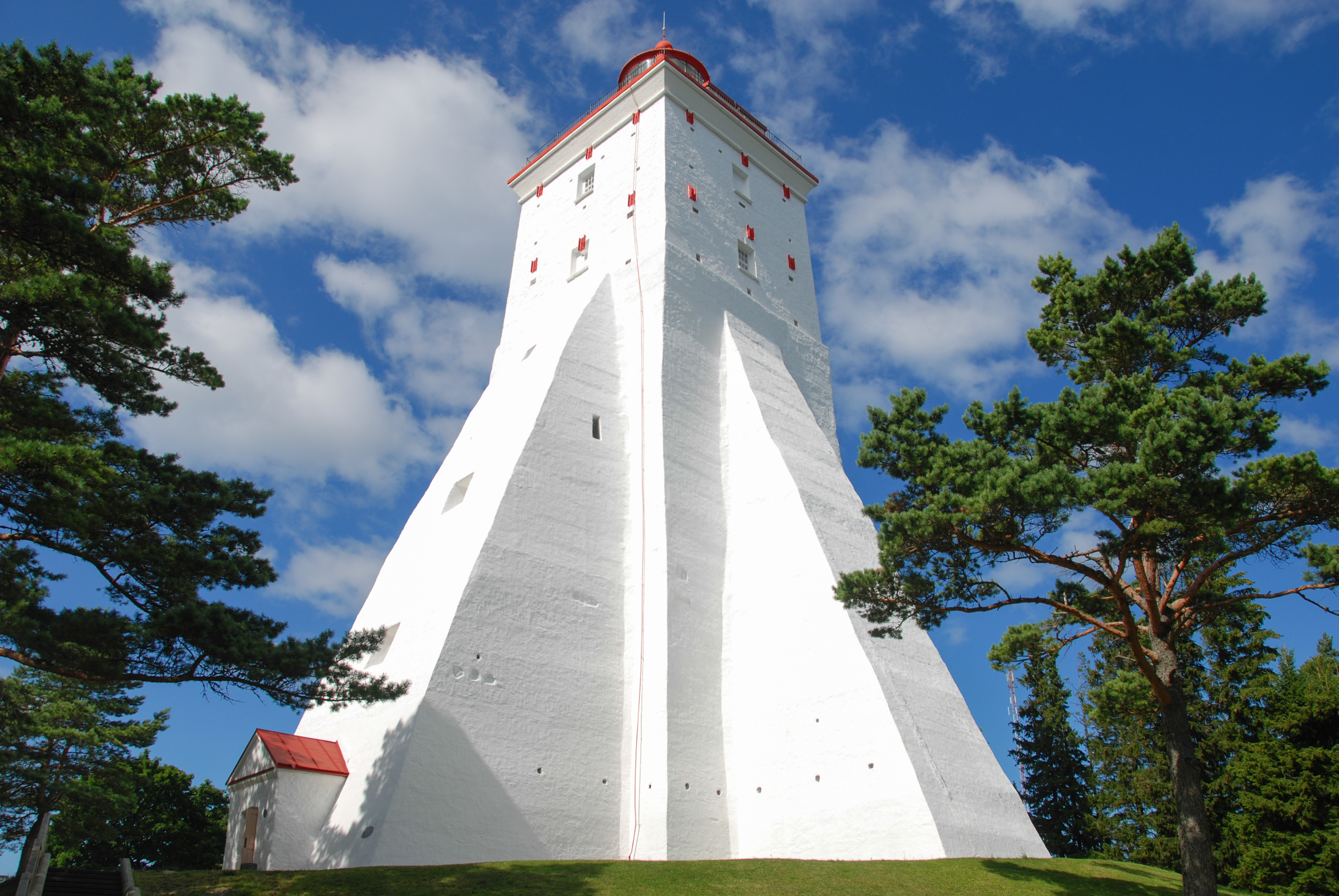
- Kõpu Lighthouse in Mägipe

- Location within Estonia
- Coordinates: 58°55′N 22°12′E
- Country: Estonia
- County: Hiiu County
- Parish: Hiiumaa Parish
- Time zone: UTC+2 (EET)
  - Summer (DST): UTC+3 (EEST)

Mägipe is a village in Hiiumaa Parish, Hiiu County in northwestern Estonia. Before 2013, it was located in Kõrgessaare Parish.

The Kõpu Lighthouse is located in Mägipe.
