= Lehtma =

Village in Estonia

- Village
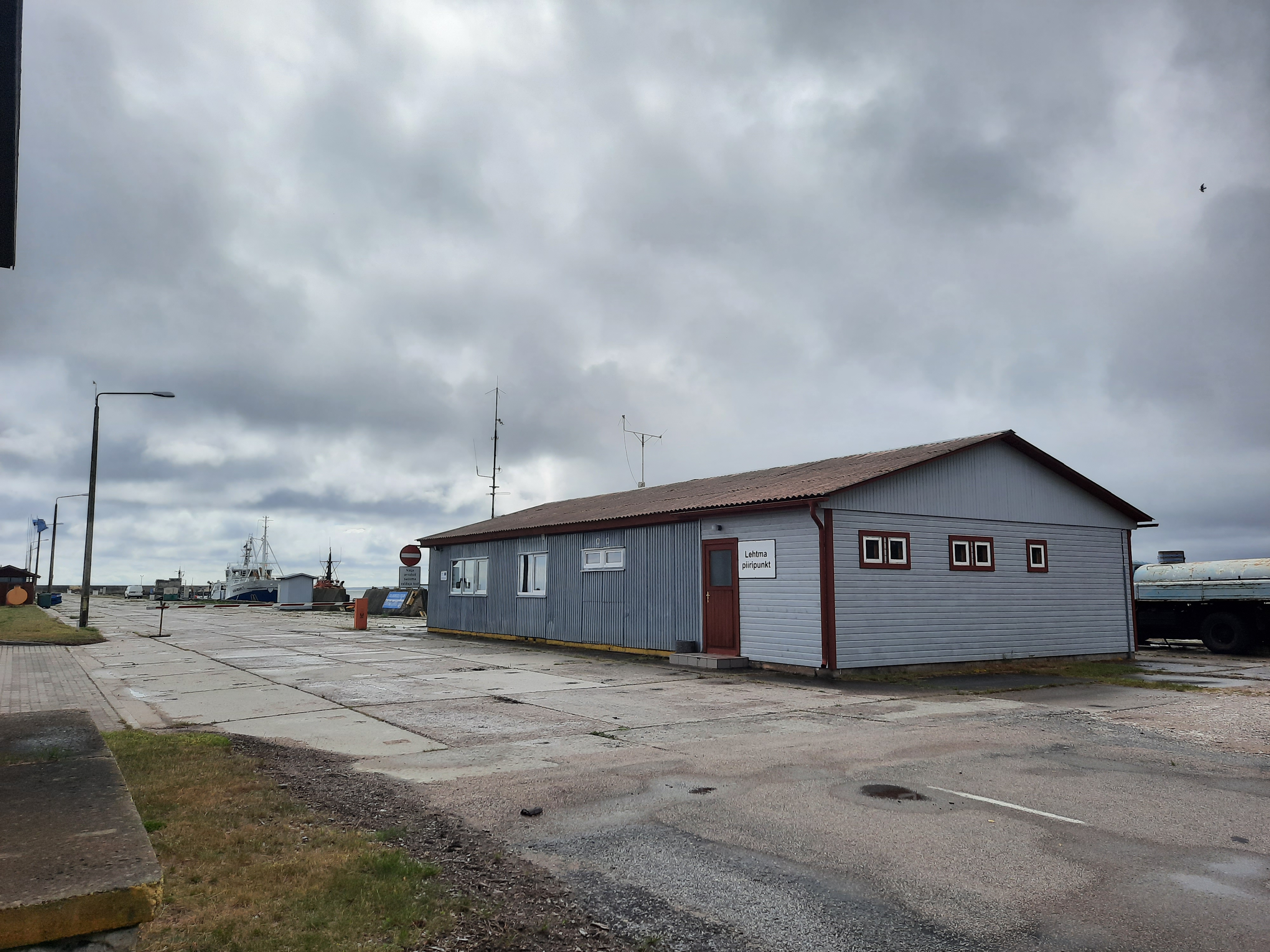
- Buildings at the Port of Lehtma

- Location within Estonia
- Coordinates: 59°4′13″N 22°41′33″E
- Country: Estonia
- County: Hiiu County
- Parish: Hiiumaa Parish

Population (2012)
  - Total: 1
- Time zone: UTC+2 (EET)
  - Summer (DST): UTC+3 (EEST)

Lehtma is a fishing village in Hiiumaa Parish, Hiiu County in northwestern Estonia. Before 2013, it was located in Kõrgessaare Parish.
