= Kurisu, Hiiumaa Parish =

Village in Estonia

Kurisu
- Village
- Location within Estonia
- Coordinates: 58°57′39″N 22°33′04″E
- Country: Estonia
- County: Hiiu County
- Parish: Hiiumaa Parish

Population (2019)
  - Total: 35
- Time zone: UTC+2 (EET)
  - Summer (DST): UTC+3 (EEST)

Kurisu is a village in Hiiumaa Parish, Hiiu County in northwestern Estonia. Before 2013, it was located in Kõrgessaare Parish.

== Name ==
Kurisu was attested in historical sources as Kwrwese Bencht in 1564, Kurris Andreiß in 1576, and Kurjuße Matz in 1666, along with various other forms referring to individuals in the village, as well as Kuriuße in 1636, Kurißby in 1688, and Kurriso in 1798. The linguist Paul Ariste and the onomastician Leo Tiik identify the common noun kurisu 'karst sinkhole' as the origin of the village name, and the Finnish linguist Lauri Kettunen drew attention to the pseudoetymology kurisu < kuri + suu 'evil mouth'. There is a large karst sinkhole on the northeast edge of the village called the Kurisu Sinkhole (Estonian: Kurisu neeluauk).
