= Jõesuu, Hiiu County =

Village in Estonia

Jõesuu
- Village
- Location within Estonia
- Coordinates: 58°53′02″N 22°25′00″E
- Country: Estonia
- County: Hiiu County
- Parish: Hiiumaa Parish
- Time zone: UTC+2 (EET)
  - Summer (DST): UTC+3 (EEST)

Jõesuu is a village in Hiiumaa Parish, Hiiu County in northwestern Estonia.

The village was first mentioned in 1913 (Іоэсуу). Historically, the village was part of Kõrgessaare Manor (German: Hohenholm). Before 2013, it was located in Kõrgessaare Parish.

The village is located at the mouth of the Vanajõgi River.
