= Koidma =

Village in Estonia

- Village
- Location within Estonia
- Coordinates: 58°59′N 22°37′E
- Country: Estonia
- County: Hiiu County
- Parish: Hiiumaa Parish
- Time zone: UTC+2 (EET)
  - Summer (DST): UTC+3 (EEST)

Koidma is a village in Hiiumaa Parish, Hiiu County in northwestern Estonia. It has five inhabitants as per 2011 census. Koidma is 8 km away from the capital Kärdla. Before 2013, it was located in Kõrgessaare Parish.
