= Kalana, Hiiu County =

Village in Estonia

Kalana
- Village
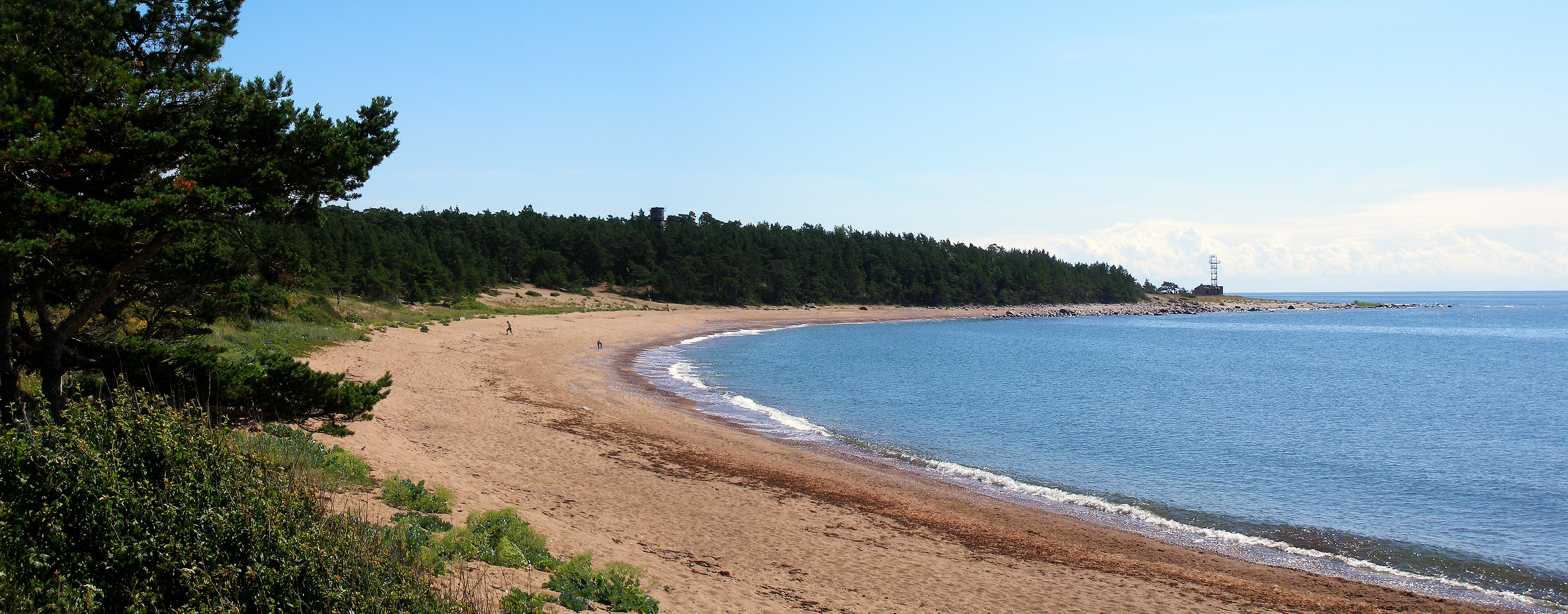
- Ristna beach

- Location in Estonia
- Coordinates: 58°55′13″N 22°04′36″E
- Country: Estonia
- County: Hiiu County
- Municipality: Hiiumaa Parish

Population (01.02.2011)
  - Total: 29

Kalana (Swedish: Dagerort) is a village in Hiiumaa Parish, Hiiu County in northwestern Estonia. It is located at the end of the Kõpu Peninsula, part of the island of Hiiumaa. Kalana has a population of 29 (as of 1 February 2011). It is also known as Dagerort (Дагерорт) in Swedish and Russian.

The village was first mentioned in 1531 (Vischorde); the first Estonian-language mention was in 1798 (Kallana). Historically, the village was part of Kõrgessaare Manor (German: Hohenholm) and Kõpu Manor (German: Köppo). Before 2013, it was located in Kõrgessaare Parish.

The westernmost part of the village is Ristna or Ristna nina ((lit. 'Ristna Cape')).

== Gallery ==
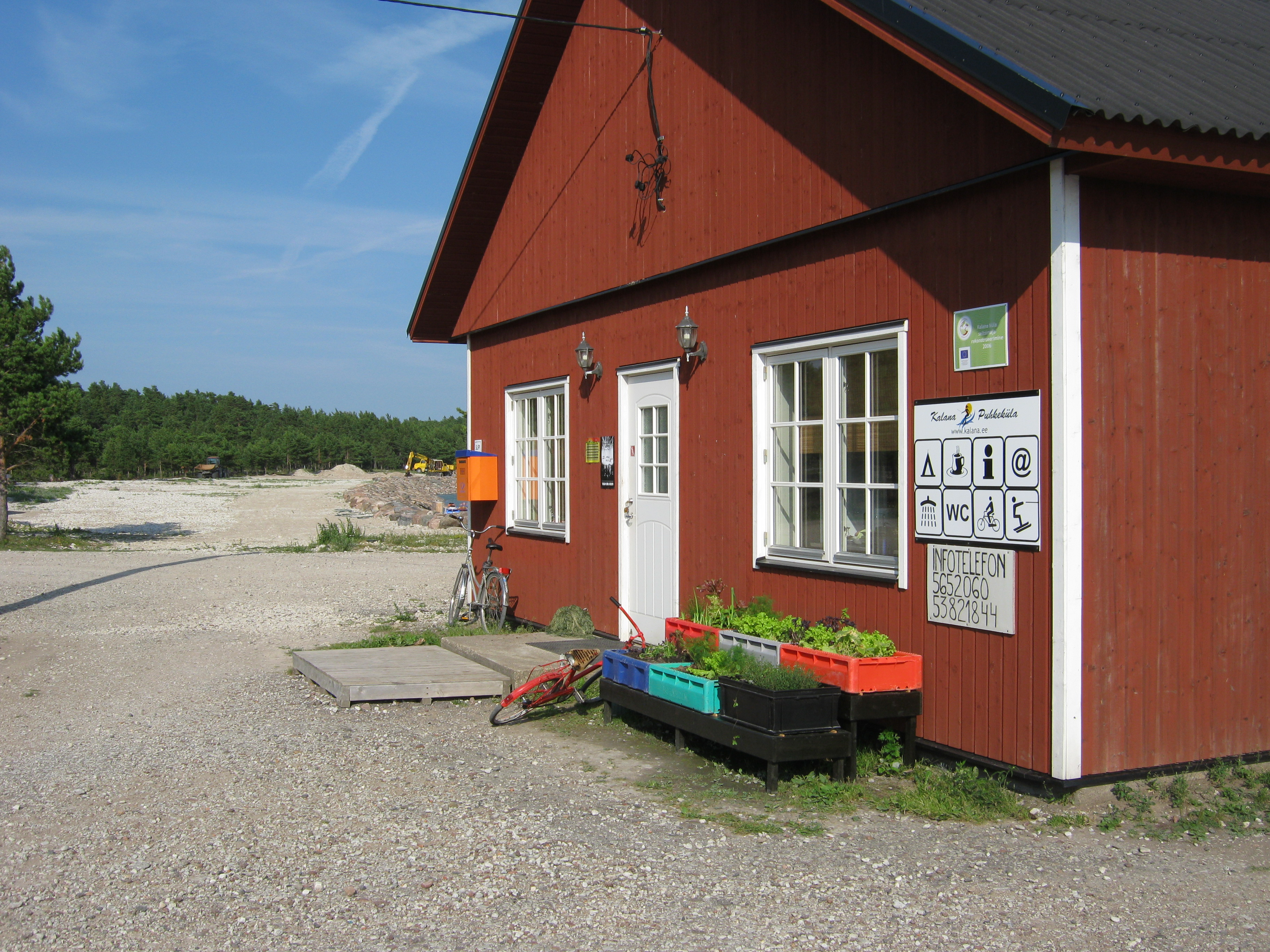
Kalana, Estonia

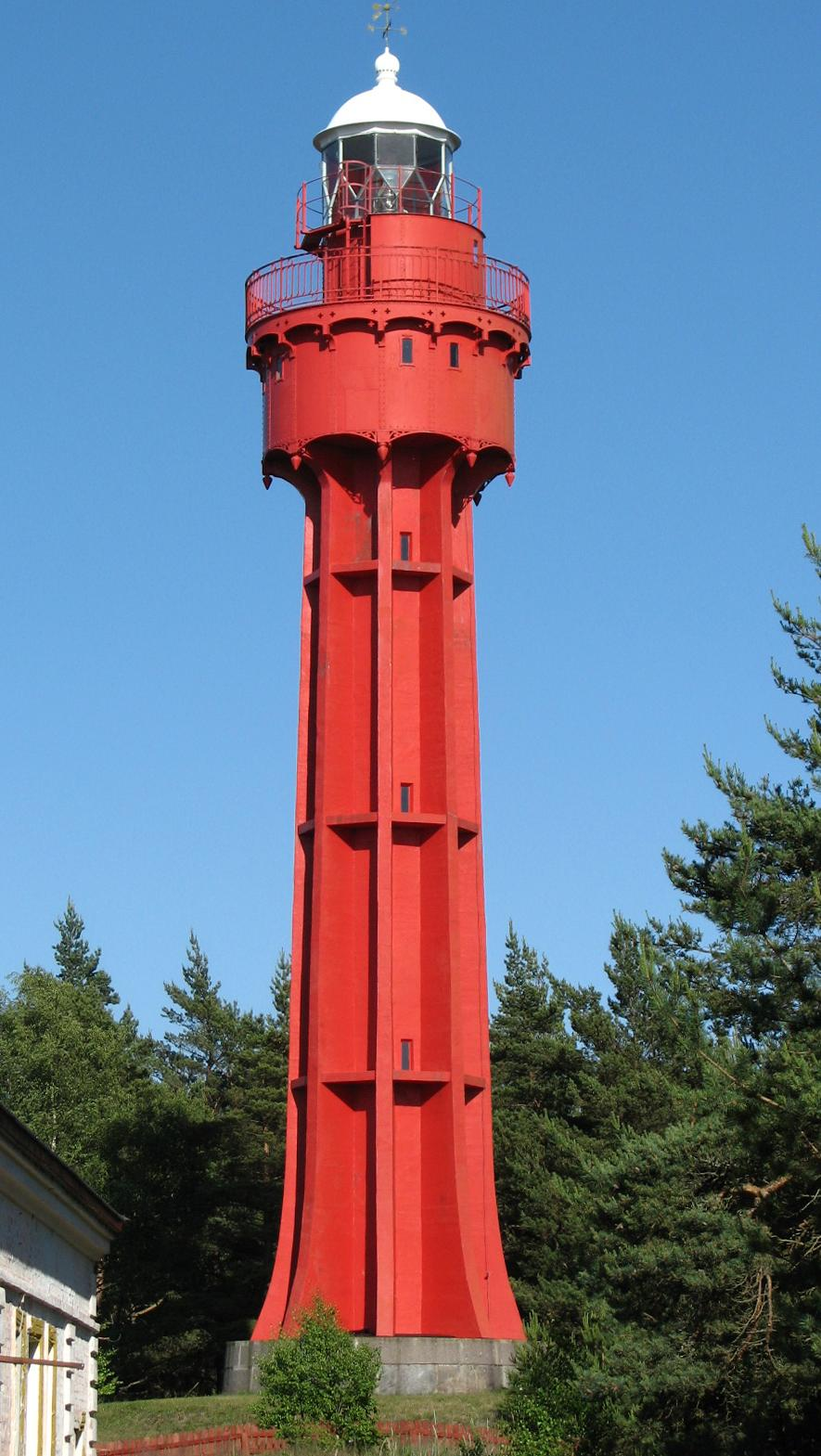
Ristna lighthouse in Kalana
