= Kaleste =

Village in Estonia

- Village
- Location within Estonia
- Coordinates: 58°55′N 22°09′E
- Country: Estonia
- County: Hiiu County
- Parish: Hiiumaa Parish
- Time zone: UTC+2 (EET)
  - Summer (DST): UTC+3 (EEST)

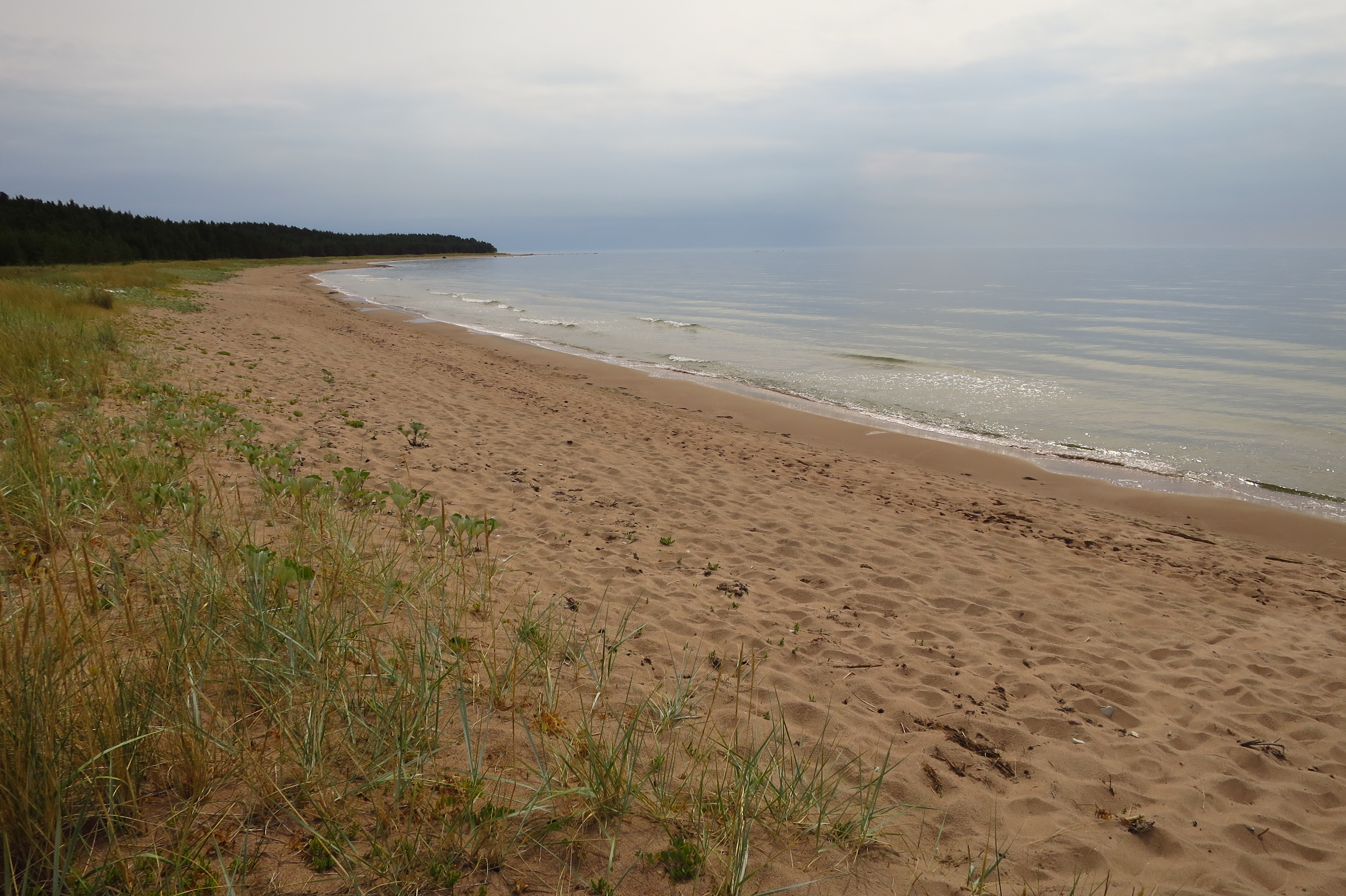
Kaleste bay

Kaleste is a village in Hiiumaa Parish, Hiiu County, in northwestern Estonia.

The village was first mentioned in 1844 (Kalleste). Historically, the village was part of Kõrgessaare Manor (German: Hohenholm). Before 2013, it was located in Kõrgessaare Parish.
