= Luidja =

Village in Estonia

- Village
- Location in Estonia
- Coordinates: 58°55′55″N 22°23′24″E
- Country: Estonia
- County: Hiiu County
- Municipality: Hiiumaa Parish

Population (2011 Census)
  - Total: 34

Luidja is a village in Hiiumaa Parish, Hiiu County, on the island of Hiiumaa in Estonia. It is located on the northern coast of the beginning of Kõpu Peninsula, by the Luidja Bay. As of the 2011 census, the village's population was 34. Before 2013, it was located in Kõrgessaare Parish.

Luidja is the site of one of the most popular beaches on Hiiumaa. Another main sight is Luidja alder forest which was planted 1901–1903 as an experiment to fixate unique sand dunes. There's a memorial stone to Karl Friedrich Vilhelm Ahrens (1855–1938), the executer of the project.
