= Hiiu County =

County of Estonia

Hiiu County Hiiumaa
- County
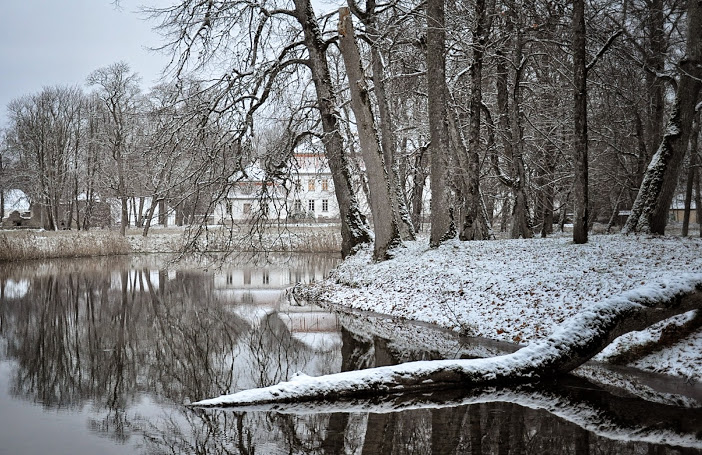

- Flag Coat of arms

- Coordinates: 59°15′N 26°20′E
- Country: Estonia
- Capital: Kärdla

Area
  - Total: 1,023.26 km^{2} (395.08 sq mi)

Population (2024)
  - Total: 9,568
  - Rank: 15th
  - Density: 9.351/km^{2} (24.22/sq mi)

Ethnicity
  - Estonians: 98.5%
  - Russians: 0.6%
  - Finns: 0.2%

GDP
  - Total: €146 million (2022)
  - Per capita: €17,225 (2022)
- ISO 3166 code: EE-39
- Vehicle registration: H

Hiiu County (Estonian: Hiiu maakond or Hiiumaa) is one of 15 counties of Estonia, being the smallest county both in terms of area and population. It consists of Hiiumaa (German and Swedish: Dagö), the second-largest island of Estonia, and several smaller islands near it. The county borders Lääne County to the east and Saare County to the south.

== History ==
Human habitation of Hiiumaa can be traced back to the fifth millennium BC. Mesolithic sites on the Kõpu Peninsula are exemplified by seal-hunters' settlements. There are several well-preserved grave fields of the Iron Age. The island was first mentioned in 1228, in annals written under the name Dageida. In 1254, Hiiumaa was divided between the Livonian Order and the Bishopric of Ösel-Wiek. In 1563 Hiiumaa was annexed into Sweden. In 1710, as a result of the Great Northern War the island went under the control of the Russian Empire. During World War I, the German military forces occupied Hiiumaa in 1917. In 1918–1940 Hiiumaa was part of the Republic of Estonia, then until 1991 occupied by the Soviet Union.

At the demands of the Hanseatic League a lighthouse was built in Kõpu (previously known as Dagerort) at the beginning of the 16th century. It is considered the third-oldest continuously operating lighthouse in the world, still showing its light to 35 miles (56 km) of the sea.

The oldest surviving building in the county is Pühalepa Church, which the Teutonic Order began building as a fortress church in 1225. The vaulted stone church was completed in the 14th century, and construction of the tower began in 1770. After a 19th-century renovation, the crosses of the Order of Malta were painted on the wall of the nave, which is associated with the membership of the Ungern-Sternberg family in this order. In the post-war years, the church was used as a warehouse. In 1993, the building was consecrated as a church again.

Most of the farm architecture comes from the 19th century. Prominent examples include the Mihkli farming complex and Soera farm-museum with historical national artifacts.

== Sights ==
Most important sights:

- Suuremõisa manor
- Kõpu Lighthouse and ancient graves
- Suursadam port
- Tahkuna Lighthouse and associated coastal defenses
- Ristna Lighthouse
- Sääretirp
- Saarnaki laid and other isles
- Kärdla town
- Käina church ruins
- Ristimägi hill
- Reigi church
- Kärdla meteorite crater
- Kassari chapel, Kassari

== County government ==
Previously the County Government (Estonian: Maavalitsus) was led by Governor (Estonian: maavanem), who is appointed by the Government of Estonia for a term of five years. The last Governor was Riho Rahuoja 2012−2017.

== Religion ==
The following congregations of the Estonian Evangelical Lutheran Church (EELC) operate in Hiiu County under Saarte Deanery (in Estonian Deanery of the Islands) of EELC: Emmaste congregation, Pühalepa St. Lawrence congregation, Käina St. Martin's congregation, Reigi Jesus congregation, and Kärdla St. John the Baptist congregation. Services are also held in the Mänspäe and Kassari chapels.

Regarding Eastern Orthodoxy, there is under the administration of the Tallinn Archdiocese of the Estonian Apostolic Orthodox Church the Kuriste Church of the Nativity of the Theotokos in the southern part of the island.

Baptist congregations operating in Hiiu County: Emmaste-Nurste, Harju, Hilleste, Jausa, Käina, Kärdla, Lauka, Luguse, Palade, Ühtri and Hiiumaa Christian Missionary Congregation.

Religious affiliations in Hiiu County, census 2000–2021*
Religion	2000		2011		2021	
Religion	Number	%	Number	%	Number	%
Christianity	1,439	17.7	1,167	16.0	960	12.9
—Orthodox Christians	88	1.0	91	1.2	170	2.3
—Lutherans	972	12.0	790	10.8	560	7.3
—Catholics	8	0.1	6	0.08	20	0.2
—Baptists	319	3.9	182	2.5	120	1.6
—Jehovah's Witnesses	25	0.3	23	0.3	30	0.4
—Pentecostals	13	0.1	9	0.09	-	-
—Old Believers	1	0.01	1	0.01	-	-
—Methodists	3	0.03	3	0.04	-	-
—Adventists	10	0.09	5	0.06	-	-
—Other Christians	-	-	57	0.7	60	0.8
Islam	-	-	1	0.01	-	-
Buddhism	-	-	4	0.04	-	-
Other religions**	65	0.8	78	1.0	70	0.9
No religion	3,183	39.2	4,903	67.2	5,450	73.2
Not stated***	3,418	42.1	1,124	15.4	910	12.2
Total population*	8,105		7,291		7,440	
*The censuses of Estonia count the religious affiliations of the population older than 15 years of age. ".

== Education ==
There are six schools in the county, one upper secondary school and one vocational education institution in Suuremõisa.

== Municipalities ==
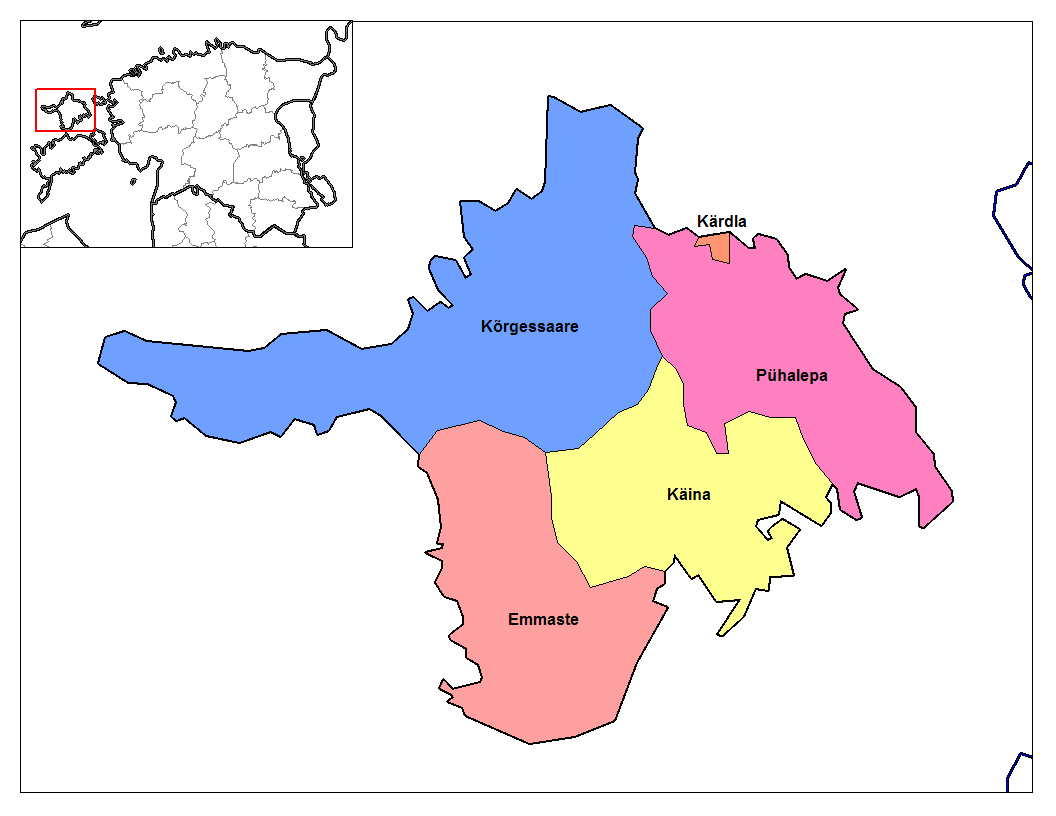
Municipalities in Hiiu County until 2017

The county consists of one municipality after the administrative reform of 2017. Between 2013 and 2017 the county was subdivided into 4 municipalities (Estonian: vallad – parishes). The only urban settlement Kärdla is part of Hiiumaa Parish since 2017.

Rural municipalities:

- Hiiumaa Parish (includes the town of Kärdla)

== Geography ==
The county includes the islands of Hiiumaa (980 km^{2} (380 sq mi)) and Kassari (19 km^{2} (7.3 sq mi)) and a number of surrounding islets. The highest point is Tornimägi hill (68 m (223 ft)), the longest river is Luguse (21 km (13 mi)), and the biggest lake is Tihu Suurjärv (85 ha (210 acres)).

In the landscapes there can be found pine forests, mixed spruce and deciduous forests, swampy thickets and juniper shrubs, coastal meadows and bogs. The most frequent tree is pine which makes about a half of forests. Pine is followed by birch, spruce and alder. In total, there are about 1,000 species of vascular plants, of which about 100 are under protection. The wildlife of Hiiumaa is remarkable. Out of 30 species of mammals, big game as elk, deer, fox, wild boar and lynx roam the island. There are about 250 species of birds on the island, 195 of them nesting.

Among the Estonian counties Hiiumaa is the richest in forest – nearly 60% of the island are wooded areas. There are large marsh areas in the middle of the island. The marshes cover about 7% of its area. Cultivated land and settlements take about 23% of the area of the county.
