= List of lighthouses in Estonia =

This is a list of lighthouses in Estonia.

== Lighthouses ==
Name	Image	Location / Coordinates	Waterbody	Year built	Tower Height	Focal Height
Abruka Range Lights: Abruka Lighthouse / Abruka Front Light Beacon		(Abruka island); Abruka, Saaremaa Parish, Saare County; 58°8′57″N 22°31′28″E	Gulf of Riga, Baltic Sea	1931	36 m (118 ft)	38 m (125 ft)
Abruka Range Lights: Abruka Lighthouse / Abruka Front Light Beacon		(Abruka island); Abruka, Saaremaa Parish, Saare County; 58°9′1″N 22°32′8″E	Gulf of Riga, Baltic Sea	1998	21 m (69 ft)	22 m (72 ft)
Aksi Light Beacon		(Aksi island); Idaotsa, Viimsi Parish, Harju County; 59°35′44″N 25°5′54″E	Gulf of Finland, Baltic Sea		15 m (49 ft)	21.5 m (71 ft)
Anseküla Range Lights: Anseküla Lighthouse / Lõu Light Beacon		Anseküla, Saaremaa Parish, Saare County; 58°5′54″N 22°13′53″E	Kaugatoma Bay, Baltic Sea	1953	22 m (72 ft)	42 m (138 ft)
Anseküla Range Lights: Anseküla Lighthouse / Lõu Light Beacon		Lõu, Saaremaa Parish, Saare County; 58°6′17″N 22°10′47″E	Kaugatoma Bay, Baltic Sea		9 m (30 ft)	11 m (36 ft)
Emmaste Range Lights: Emmaste Rear Light Beacon / Emmaste Front Light Beacon		Rannaküla, Hiiumaa Parish, Hiiu County; 58°41′27″N 22°34′19″E	Soela Strait, Väinameri, Baltic Sea	1947	19 m (62 ft)	19 m (62 ft)
Emmaste Range Lights: Emmaste Rear Light Beacon / Emmaste Front Light Beacon		Rannaküla, Hiiumaa Parish, Hiiu County; 58°41′27″N 22°33′13″E	Soela Strait, Väinameri, Baltic Sea	1935	11 m (36 ft)	11 m (36 ft)
Heltermaa Range Lights: Heltermaa Rear Light Beacon / Heltermaa Front Light Beacon		Heltermaa, Hiiumaa Parish, Hiiu County; 58°51′53″N 23°2′32.5″E	Väinameri, Baltic Sea	1948		19 m (62 ft)
Heltermaa Range Lights: Heltermaa Rear Light Beacon / Heltermaa Front Light Beacon		Heltermaa, Hiiumaa Parish, Hiiu County; 58°51′56″N 23°2′52″E	Väinameri, Baltic Sea	1948	8 m (26 ft)	12 m (39 ft)
Hiiessaare Range Lights: Paluküla Church / Hiiessaare Lighthouse		Paluküla, Hiiumaa Parish, Hiiu County; 58°59′13″N 22°48′18″E	Tareste Bay, Gulf of Finland, Baltic Sea		29 m (95 ft)	
Hiiessaare Range Lights: Paluküla Church / Hiiessaare Lighthouse		Hiiessaare, Hiiumaa Parish, Hiiu County; 59°0′6″N 22°50′19″E	Tareste Bay, Gulf of Finland, Baltic Sea	1953	17 m (56 ft)	19 m (62 ft)
Hülkari Light Beacon		(Naissaar island); Lõunaküla, Viimsi Parish, Harju County; 59°32′27″N 24°33′48″E	Tallinn Bay, Gulf of Finland, Baltic Sea	1954	15 m (49 ft)	20 m (66 ft)
Ihasalu Lighthouse		Neeme, Jõelähtme Parish, Harju County; 59°32′26″N 25°8′33″E	Ihasalu Bay, Gulf of Finland, Baltic Sea	1938	10 m (33 ft)	
Juminda Lighthouse		Juminda, Kuusalu Parish, Harju County; 59°38′48″N 25°30′37″E	Gulf of Finland, Baltic Sea	1937	32 m (105 ft)	40 m (130 ft)
Kaavi Lighthouse		Kaavi, Saaremaa Parish, Saare County; 57°58′56″N 22°11′43″E	Gulf of Riga, Baltic Sea	1954	15 m (49 ft)	20 m (66 ft)
Kallavere Range Lights: Kallavere Rear Light Beacon / Kallavere Front Light Beacon		Kallavere, Jõelähtme Parish, Harju County; 59°29′26″N 25°1′26″E	Ihasalu Bay, Gulf of Finland, Baltic Sea	1986	40 m (130 ft)	60 m (200 ft)
Kallavere Range Lights: Kallavere Rear Light Beacon / Kallavere Front Light Beacon		Saviranna, Jõelähtme Parish, Harju County; 59°30′9″N 25°1′40″E	Ihasalu Bay, Gulf of Finland, Baltic Sea	1986	25 m (82 ft)	41 m (135 ft)
Käsmu Lighthouse		Käsmu, Haljala Parish, Lääne-Viru County; 59°36′18″N 25°55′18″E	Käsmu Bay, Gulf of Finland, Baltic Sea	1892	6 m (20 ft)	6 m (20 ft)
Keri Lighthouse		(Keri island); Kelnase, Viimsi Parish, Harju County; 59°41′55″N 25°1′22″E	Gulf of Finland, Baltic Sea	1858	28 m (92 ft)	31 m (102 ft)
Kesse Range Lights: Kesse Rear Light Beacon / Kesse Front Light Beacon		(Kesselaid island); Kesse, Muhu Parish, Saare County; 58°37′44″N 23°25′31″E	Great Strait (Suur väin), Väinameri, Baltic Sea	1879 (1953)	18 m (59 ft)	23 m (75 ft)
Kesse Range Lights: Kesse Rear Light Beacon / Kesse Front Light Beacon		(Kesselaid island); Kesse, Muhu Parish, Saare County; 58°37′57″N 23°24′54″E	Great Strait (Suur väin), Väinameri, Baltic Sea	1879 (1953)	9 m (30 ft)	12 m (39 ft)
Kihnu Lighthouse		Rootsiküla, Kihnu Parish, Pärnu County; 58°5′49″N 23°58′16″E	Gulf of Riga, Baltic Sea	1865	28 m (92 ft)	29 m (95 ft)
Kiipsaare Lighthouse		Kõruse-Metsaküla, Saaremaa Parish, Saare County; 58°29′45″N 21°50′28″E	Baltic Sea	1933	26 m (85 ft)	
Kopli Bay Range Lights: Kopli Bay Rear Light Beacon / Kopli Bay Front Light Beacon		Tallinn, Harju County; 59°25′59″N 24°41′4″E	Kopli Bay, Tallinn Bay, Gulf of Finland, Baltic Sea	1971	14 m (46 ft)	19 m (62 ft)
Kopli Bay Range Lights: Kopli Bay Rear Light Beacon / Kopli Bay Front Light Beacon		Tallinn, Harju County; 59°26′7″N 24°40′46″E	Kopli Bay, Tallinn Bay, Gulf of Finland, Baltic Sea	1995	11.5 m (38 ft)	10.5 m (34 ft)
Kõpu Lighthouse		Mägipe, Hiiumaa Parish, Hiiu County; 58°54′57″N 22°11′59″E	Baltic Sea	1531	38 m (125 ft)	102.6 m (337 ft)
Kübassaare Lighthouse		Kübassaare, Saaremaa Parish, Saare County; 58°25′42″N 23°18′0″E	Gulf of Riga, Baltic Sea	1924	18 m (59 ft)	
Laidunina Lighthouse		Asva, Saaremaa Parish, Saare County; 58°22′46″N 23°5′17″E	Gulf of Riga, Baltic Sea	1907	24 m (79 ft)	27 m (89 ft)
Letipea Lighthouse		Letipea, Viru-Nigula Parish, Lääne-Viru County; 59°33′9″N 26°36′25″E	Gulf of Finland, Baltic Sea	1951	15 m (49 ft)	19 m (62 ft)
Liu Light Beacon		Liu, Pärnu, Pärnu County; 58°16′38″N 24°15′52″E	Gulf of Riga, Baltic Sea	1956	28 m (92 ft)	30 m (98 ft)
Manilaid Light Beacon		(Manilaid island), Manija, Pärnu, Pärnu County; 58°12′12″N 24°6′0″E	Kihnu Strait, Gulf of Riga, Baltic Sea	1933	8 m (26 ft)	9 m (30 ft)
Mehikoorma Lighthouse		Mehikoorma, Räpina Parish, Põlva County; 58°14′0″N 27°28′36″E	Lämmijärv, Lake Peipus-Pskov	1938	15 m (49 ft)	16 m (52 ft)
Mohni Lighthouse		(Mohni island), Viinistu, Kuusalu Parish, Harju County; 59°41′2″N 25°47′44″E	Gulf of Finland, Baltic Sea	1871	27.4 m (90 ft)	33 m (108 ft)
Naissaar Lighthouse		(Naissaar island), Tagaküla, Viimsi Parish, Harju County; 59°36′13″N 24°30′38″E	Gulf of Finland, Baltic Sea	1960	45 m (148 ft)	48 m (157 ft)
Naissaar Harbour Light Beacon		(Naissaar island), Lõunaküla, Viimsi Parish, Harju County; 59°33′21″N 24°33′3″E	Tallinn Bay, Gulf of Finland, Baltic Sea	1960	8 m (26 ft)	10 m (33 ft)
Narva-Jõesuu Lighthouse		Narva-Jõesuu, Narva-Jõesuu municipality, Ida-Viru County; 59°28′5″N 28°2′25″E	Narva Bay, Gulf of Finland, Baltic Sea	1957	31 m (102 ft)	35 m (115 ft)
Ninaküla Lighthouse		Nina, Peipsiääre Parish, Tartu County; 58°36′27″N 27°12′34″E	Lake Peipus	1938	11 m (36 ft)	14 m (46 ft)
Osmussaar Lighthouse		(Osmussaar island), Osmussaare, Lääne-Nigula Parish, Lääne County; 59°18′13″N 23°21′40″E	Gulf of Finland, Baltic Sea	1954	35 m (115 ft)	39 m (128 ft)
Pakri Lighthouse		Paldiski, Lääne-Harju Parish, Harju County; 59°23′15″N 24°2′16″E	Gulf of Finland, Baltic Sea	1889	52 m (171 ft)	73 m (240 ft)
Pakri Old Lighthouse		Paldiski, Lääne-Harju Parish, Harju County; 59°23′14″N 24°2′10″E	Gulf of Finland, Baltic Sea	1808	15 m (49 ft)	
Paljassaare Harbour Range Lights: Paljassaare Harbour Rear Light Beacon / Paljassaare Harbour Front Light Beacon		Tallinn, Harju County; 59°27′24.09″N 24°41′56.76″E	Tallinn Bay, Gulf of Finland, Baltic Sea			
Paljassaare Harbour Range Lights: Paljassaare Harbour Rear Light Beacon / Paljassaare Harbour Front Light Beacon		Tallinn, Harju County; 59°27′26.8″N 24°42′9.74″E	Tallinn Bay, Gulf of Finland, Baltic Sea			
Prangli NW Light Beacon		(Prangli island), Kelnase, Viimsi Parish, Harju County; 59°38′44″N 24°58′8″E	Gulf of Finland, Baltic Sea	1960	13 m (43 ft)	16 m (52 ft)
Prangli SE Light Beacon		(Prangli island), Idaotsa, Viimsi Parish, Harju County; 59°36′56″N 25°2′14″E	Ihasalu Bay, Gulf of Finland, Baltic Sea	1954	30 m (98 ft)	38.5 m (126 ft)
Rannapungerja Light Beacon		Rannapungerja, Alutaguse Parish, Ida-Viru County; 58°58′46″N 27°10′33″E	Lake Peipus	1937	7.6 m (25 ft)	16 m (52 ft)
Raugi Range Lights: Raugi Rear Light Beacon / Raugi Front Light Beacon		Vahtraste, Muhu Parish, Saare County; 58°38′49″N 23°18′40″E	Great Strait (Suur väin), Väinameri, Baltic Sea		49 m (161 ft)	40 m (130 ft)
Raugi Range Lights: Raugi Rear Light Beacon / Raugi Front Light Beacon		Vahtraste, Muhu Parish, Saare County; 58°39′12″N 23°18′26″E	Great Strait (Suur väin), Väinameri, Baltic Sea		25 m (82 ft)	27 m (89 ft)
Ristna Lighthouse		Kalana, Hiiumaa Parish, Hiiu County; 58°56′24″N 22°3′19″E	Baltic Sea	1874	29.5 m (97 ft)	37 m (121 ft)
Roomassaare Range Lights: Roomassaare Rear Light Beacon / Roomassaare Front Light Beacon		Kuressaare, Saaremaa Parish, Saare County; 58°13′7″N 22°29′54″E	Gulf of Riga, Baltic Sea	2003	30 m (98 ft)	33 m (108 ft)
Roomassaare Range Lights: Roomassaare Rear Light Beacon / Roomassaare Front Light Beacon		Kuressaare, Saaremaa Parish, Saare County; 58°12′49″N 22°30′21″E	Gulf of Riga, Baltic Sea	1984	12 m (39 ft)	14 m (46 ft)
Ruhnu Lighthouse		(Ruhnu island), Ruhnu, Ruhnu Parish, Saare County; 57°48′5″N 23°15′37″E	Gulf of Riga, Baltic Sea	1877	40 m (130 ft)	656 m (2,152 ft)
Sääretükk Lighthouse		Rannaküla, Saaremaa Parish, Saare County; 58°15′39″N 22°49′16″E	Gulf of Riga, Baltic Sea	1954	15 m (49 ft)	19 m (62 ft)
Sõmeri Lighthouse		Matsi, Lääneranna Parish, Pärnu County; 58°21′1″N 23°44′23″E	Gulf of Riga, Baltic Sea	1954	21 m (69 ft)	23 m (75 ft)
Sorgu Lighthouse		(Sorgu island), Manija, Pärnu, Pärnu County; 59°10′43″N 23°11′59″E	Pärnu Bay, Gulf of Riga, Baltic Sea	1904	16 m (52 ft)	19 m (62 ft)
Sõru Range Lights: Sõru Lighthouse / Sõru Front Light Beacon		Hindu, Hiiumaa Parish, Hiiu County; 58°42′14″N 22°29′9″E	Soela Strait, Väinameri, Baltic Sea	1934	16 m (52 ft)	18 m (59 ft)
Sõru Range Lights: Sõru Lighthouse / Sõru Front Light Beacon		Hindu, Hiiumaa Parish, Hiiu County; 58°42′4″N 22°29′32″E	Soela Strait, Väinameri, Baltic Sea	1934	11 m (36 ft)	13 m (43 ft)
Sõrve Lighthouse		Sääre, Saaremaa Parish, Saare County; 57°54′35″N 22°3′19″E	Irbe Strait, Baltic Sea	1960	52 m (171 ft)	53 m (174 ft)
Suurupi Range Lights: Suurupi Rear Lighthouse / Suurupi Front Lighthouse		Suurupi, Harku Parish, Harju County; 59°27′49″N 24°22′49″E	Gulf of Finland, Baltic Sea	1760	22 m (72 ft)	68 m (223 ft)
Suurupi Range Lights: Suurupi Rear Lighthouse / Suurupi Front Lighthouse		Suurupi, Harku Parish, Harju County; 59°28′18″N 24°25′0″E	Gulf of Finland, Baltic Sea	1885	15 m (49 ft)	18 m (59 ft)
Tahkuna Lighthouse		Tahkuna, Hiiumaa Parish, Hiiu County; 59°5′29″N 22°35′10″E	Baltic Sea		43 m (141 ft)	43 m (141 ft)
Tallinn Range Lights: Tallinn Rear Lighthouse / Tallinn Front Lighthouse		Tallinn, Harju County; 59°25′40″N 24°48′20″E	Tallinn Bay, Gulf of Finland, Baltic Sea	1896	40 m (130 ft)	80 m (260 ft)
Tallinn Range Lights: Tallinn Rear Lighthouse / Tallinn Front Lighthouse		Tallinn, Harju County; 59°26′14″N 24°47′55″E	Tallinn Bay, Gulf of Finland, Baltic Sea	1806	18 m (59 ft)	49 m (161 ft)
Tallinnamadala Lighthouse		59.71205°N 24.7315°E	Gulf of Finland, Baltic Sea	1970	31 m (102 ft)	29 m (95 ft)
Vaindloo Lighthouse		(Vaindloo island), Vainupea, Haljala Parish, Lääne-Viru County; 59°49′2″N 26°21′39″E	Gulf of Finland, Baltic Sea	1871	17 m (56 ft)	20 m (66 ft)
Vergi Light Beacon		Vergi, Haljala Parish, Lääne-Viru County; 59°36′5″N 26°6′3″E	Gulf of Finland, Baltic Sea	1936	10 m (33 ft)	11 m (36 ft)
Vilsandi Lighthouse		(Vilsandi island), Vilsandi, Saaremaa Parish, Saare County; 58°22′58″N 21°48′48″E	Baltic Sea	1809	37 m (121 ft)	40 m (130 ft)
Virtsu Lighthouse		Virtsu, Lääneranna Parish, Pärnu County; 58°34′2″N 23°30′6″E	Great Strait (Suur väin), Väinameri, Baltic Sea	1951	18 m (59 ft)	19 m (62 ft)
Vormsi Range Lights: Vormsi Lighthouse / Vormsi Rear Light Beacon / Vormsi Front Light Beacon		Saxby, Vormsi Parish, Lääne County; 59°1′39″N 23°7′3″E	Hari Strait, Väinameri, Baltic Sea	1864	24 m (79 ft)	27 m (89 ft)
Vormsi Range Lights: Vormsi Lighthouse / Vormsi Rear Light Beacon / Vormsi Front Light Beacon		Saxby, Vormsi Parish, Lääne County; 59°1′14″N 23°7′43″E	Hari Strait, Väinameri, Baltic Sea	1957	35 m (115 ft)	41 m (135 ft)
Vormsi Range Lights: Vormsi Lighthouse / Vormsi Rear Light Beacon / Vormsi Front Light Beacon		Saxby, Vormsi Parish, Lääne County; 59°1′29.4″N 23°7′2″E	Hari Strait, Väinameri, Baltic Sea			

== See also ==
- Lists of lighthouses
