= Kaavi Lighthouse =

Lighthouse in Estonia

Kaavi Lighthouse Kaavi tuletorn
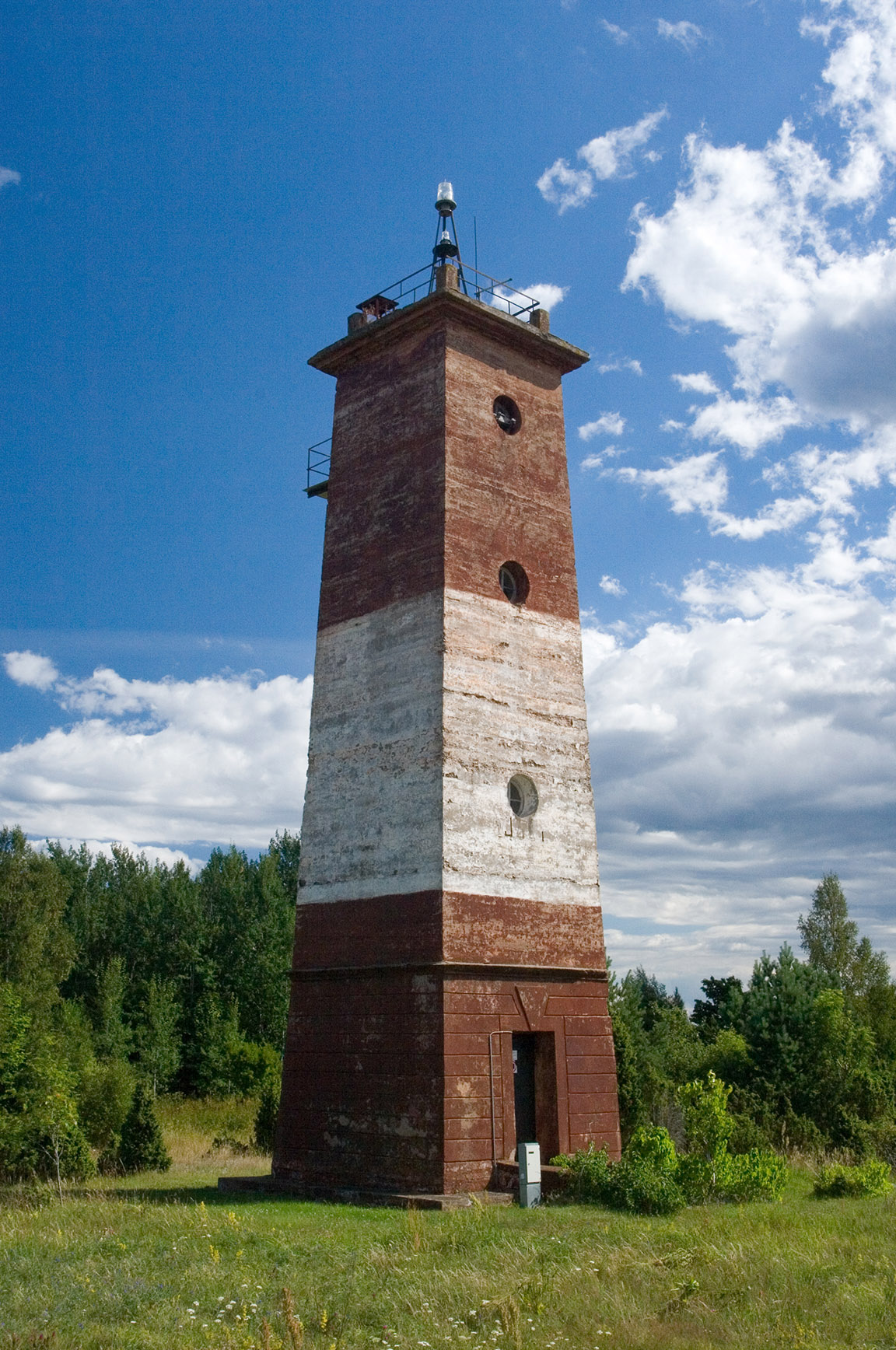
- Location: Kaavi; Torgu Parish; Estonia
- Coordinates: 57.9822°N 22.195333°E

Tower
- Constructed: 1954
- Construction: concrete tower
- Height: 15 metres (49 ft)
- Shape: square trocated pyramidal tower with balcony and no lantern
- Markings: brown tower with a white horizontal band
- Power source: aerothermal solar panel, solar power

Light
- Focal height: 20 metres (66 ft)
- Range: 9 nautical miles (17 km; 10 mi); 6 nautical miles (11 km; 6.9 mi) since 1966
- Characteristic: Fl W 2.5 s.
- Estonia no.: EVA 943

Kaavi Lighthouse (Estonian: Kaavi Tuletorn) is a lighthouse located in Sõrve Peninsula, in the village of Kaavi, Torgu Parish, on the island of Saaremaa, in Estonia.

The lighthouse is a concrete square tower, with a gallery but no lantern, mounted on a concrete square block. The lighthouse is painted brown with a broad white horizontal band in the centre of the structure. The lighthouse's location is on the southeast side of the Sõrve Peninsula, which is about four kilometres east of Mäebe.

== See also ==
- List of lighthouses in Estonia
