= Mohni Lighthouse =

Lighthouse on the island of Mohni in Estonia

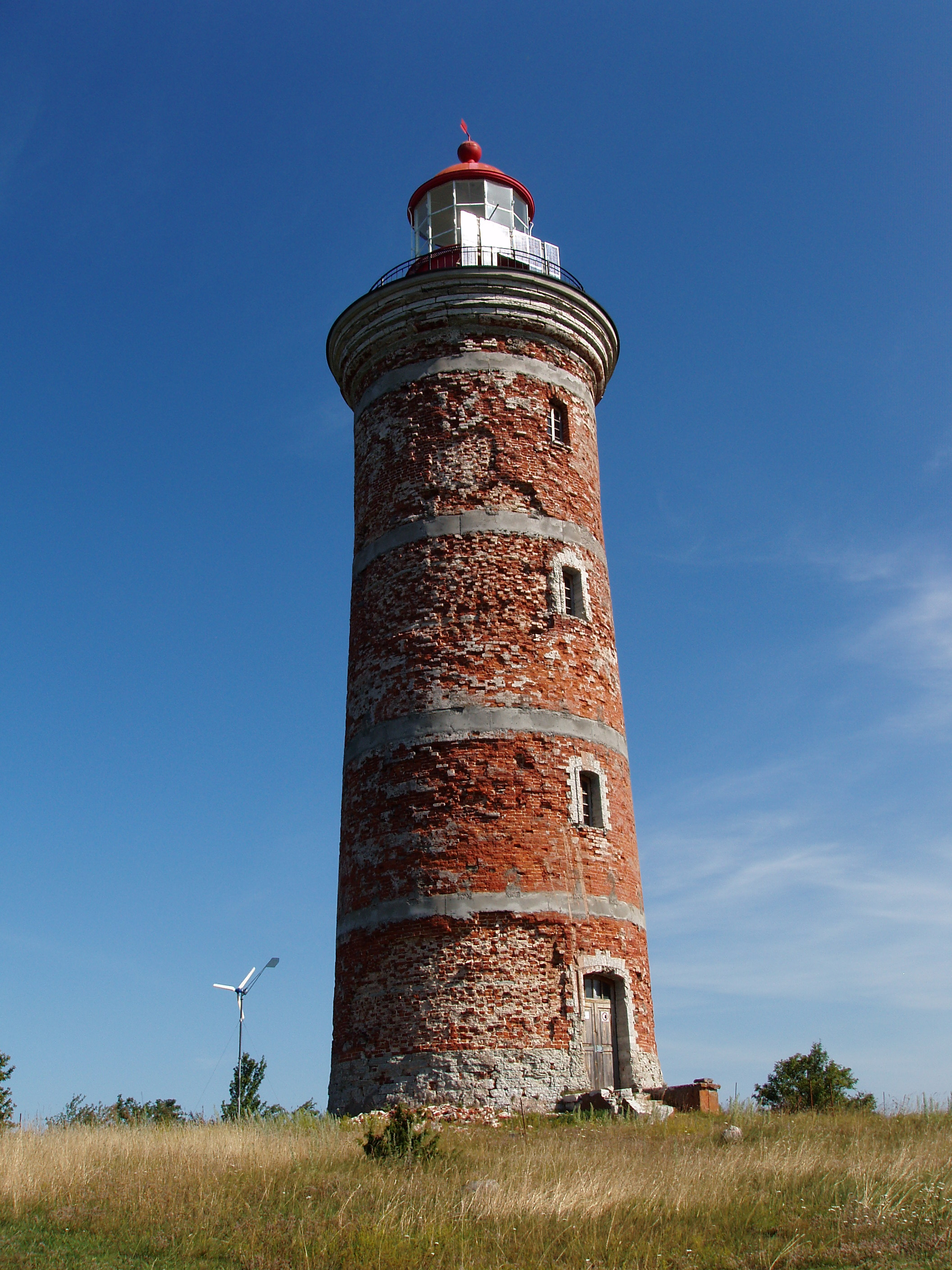
- Location: Mohni, Estonia
- Coordinates: 59°41′02.4″N 25°47′43.6″E

Tower
- Constructed: 1806 (first); 1871 rebuilt
- Construction: brick
- Height: 27 metres (89 ft)
- Shape: cylinder tower with balcony and lantern
- Markings: unpainted brick
- Heritage: n. 9487

Light
- First lit: 1852
- Focal height: 33 metres (108 ft)
- Range: 10 nautical miles (19 km; 12 mi)
- Characteristic: LFl W 20 s.
- Estonia no.: EVA 100

Mohni Lighthouse (Estonian: Mohni tuletorn) is a lighthouse located on the island of Mohni (in the Gulf of Finland), in Estonia.

== History ==
The original wooden lighthouse was built in 1806, and replaced with the 20 metre concrete structure in 1852. Due to the harsh Nordic climate, the outer bricks of the lighthouse have heavily deteriorated and a new layer of bricks (including an additional 7 metres in height) were added in 1871. The lantern room of the lighthouse was built by a Latvian based factory in Liepāja, and the dioptric apparatus was made by Chance Brothers & Co in Great Britain.

Due to the continuous deterioration of the lighthouse's outer brick surface, the lighthouse was reinforced with a layer of concrete after World War II; this layer was removed in 1998. Next to the lighthouse is the lighthouse keeper's house.

== See also ==
- List of lighthouses in Estonia
