= Anseküla Lighthouse =

Lighthouse in Estonia

Anseküla Lighthouse Anseküla tuletorn
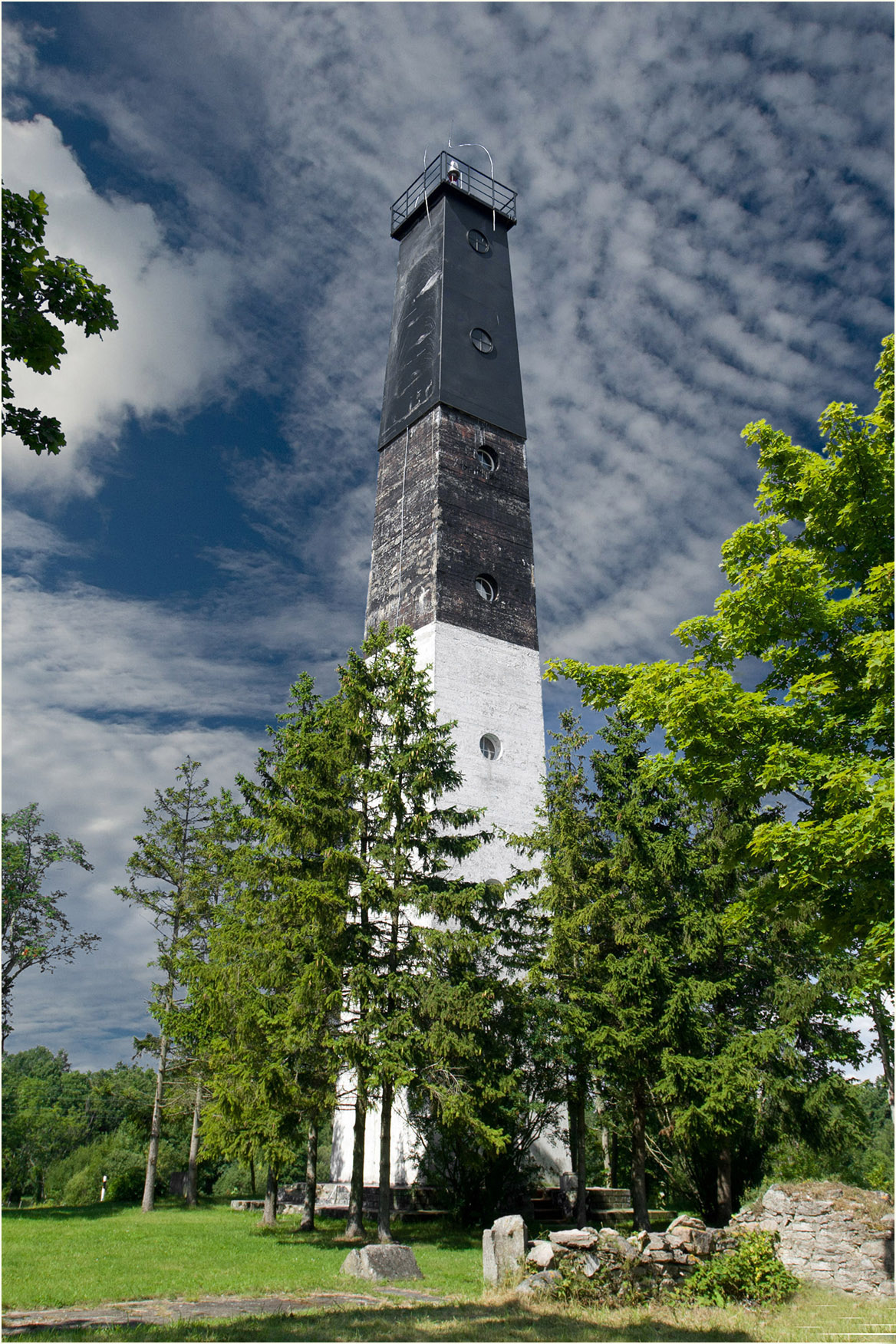
- Location: Anseküla, Saare County; Estonia
- Coordinates: 58.098283°N 22.231417°E

Tower
- Constructed: 1921
- Foundation: concrete base
- Construction: concrete tower
- Height: 31 metres (102 ft)
- Shape: square pyramidal trocated with balcony and no lantern
- Markings: white lower tower, black top tower

Light
- First lit: 1953
- Focal height: 44.1 metres (145 ft)
- Range: 7 nautical miles (13 km; 8.1 mi)
- Characteristic: Fl W 1.5s.
- Estonia no.: EVA 932

Anseküla Lighthouse (Estonian: Anseküla tuletorn) is a lighthouse located in Anseküla, on the eastern side of the Sõrve Peninsula, on the island of Saaremaa, in Estonia. The original light was on a church, which was destroyed during World War II in 1944. The current lighthouse was built in 1953. It is a concrete square tower, with a gallery but no lantern. The lighthouse's glare configuration flashes a white glare every 1.5 seconds.

== See also ==
- List of lighthouses in Estonia
