= Laidunina Lighthouse =

Lighthouse in Estonia

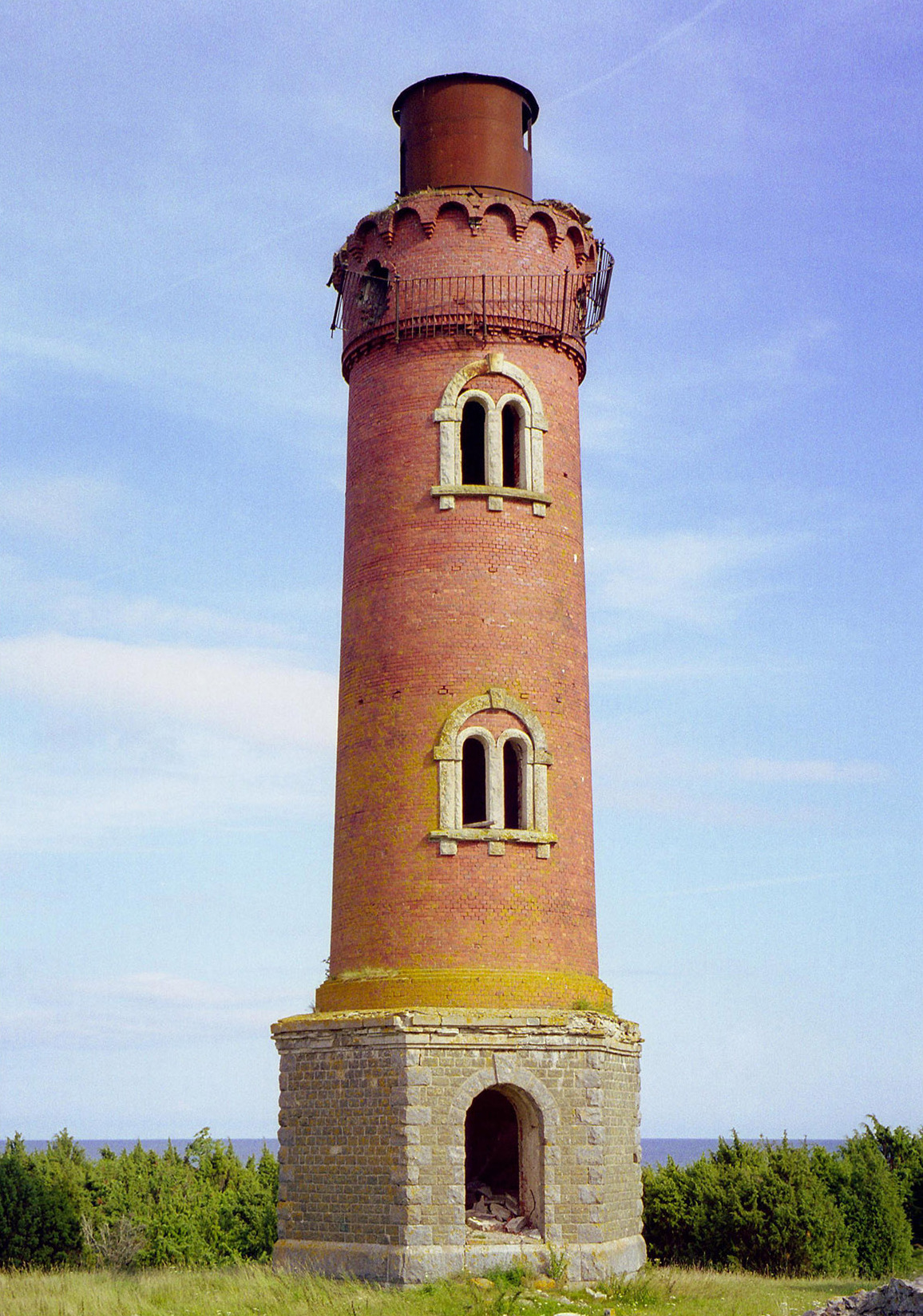
- Location: Saaremaa, Estonia
- Coordinates: 58°22′46.1″N 23°5′17.5″E

Tower
- Constructed: 1907
- Foundation: hexagonal basement
- Construction: stone basement and brick tower
- Height: 24 metres (79 ft)
- Shape: cylindrical tower with balcony and lantern removed
- Markings: unpainted tower
- Heritage: heritage monument of Estonia number 27283

Light
- First lit: 1907
- Deactivated: 1924
- Focal height: 27 metres (89 ft)
- Range: 14 nautical miles (26 km; 16 mi)

Laidunina Lighthouse (Estonian: Laidunina tuletorn) is a lighthouse located in Kahtla Peninsula, Laimjala Parish, on the island of Saaremaa, in Estonia. The lighthouse was built in 1907, built out of brick with a gallery and a one-story hexagonal stone base. The lantern was removed, with the lighthouse being deactivated in 1924. The lighting equipment was transferred to Kübassaare Lighthouse. The lighthouse was recognised as cultural monument of Estonia in 2005.

== See also ==
- List of lighthouses in Estonia
