= Kübassaar Landscape Conservation Area =

Protected area in Estonia

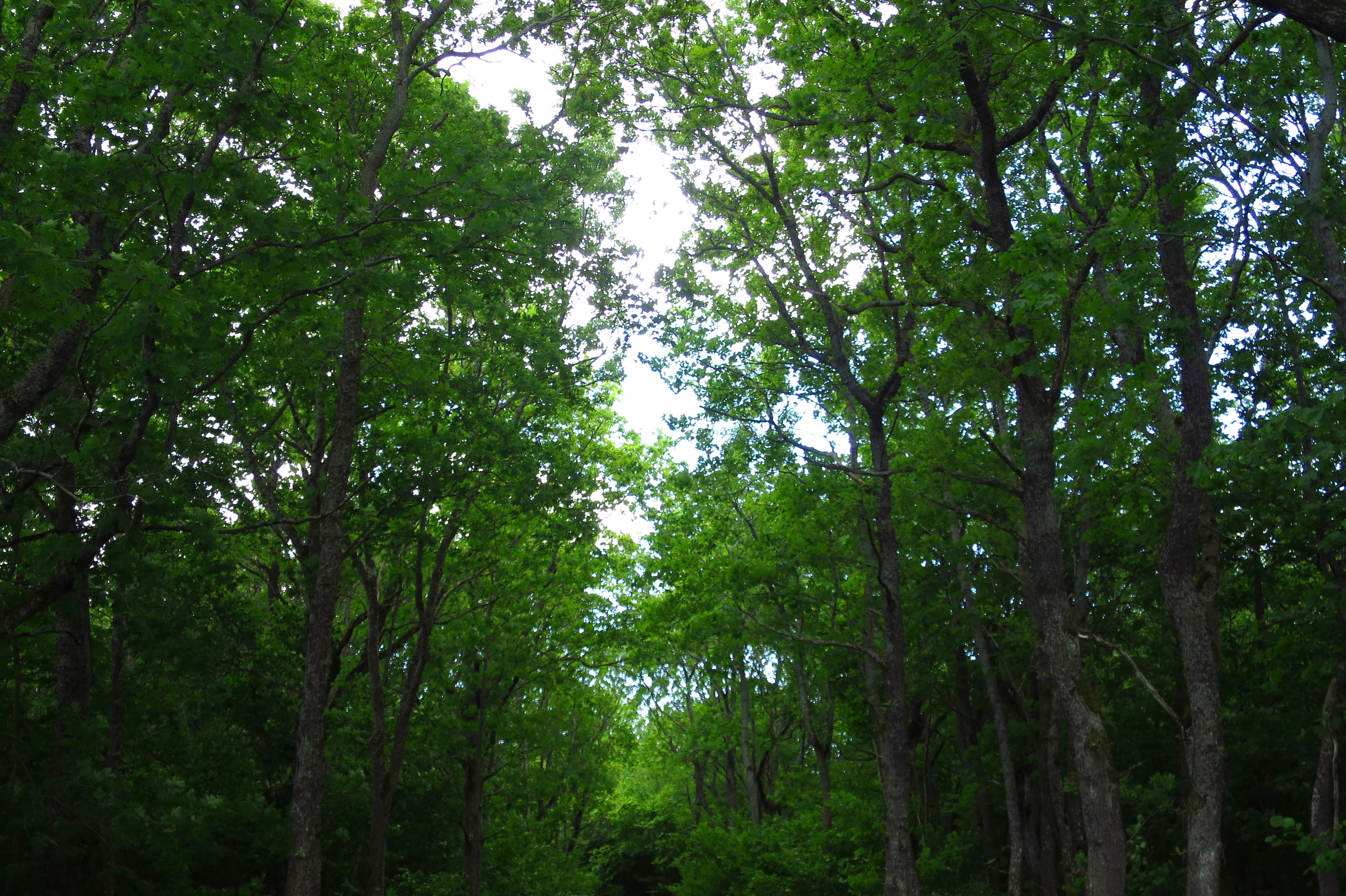

- Location within Estonia
- Location: Estonia
- Coordinates: 58°27′N 23°18′E
- Area: 517 ha (1,280 acres)
- Established: 1973 (2005)

Kübassaar Landscape Conservation Area (Estonian: Kübassaare maastikukaitseala) is a nature park in Saare County, Estonia.

Its area is 517 ha.

The protected area was founded in 1973 to protect Kübassaare broadleaved forest and its surrounding areas. In 2005, the protected area was designated to the landscape conservation area.
