= Vilsandi Lighthouse =

Lighthouse in Estonia

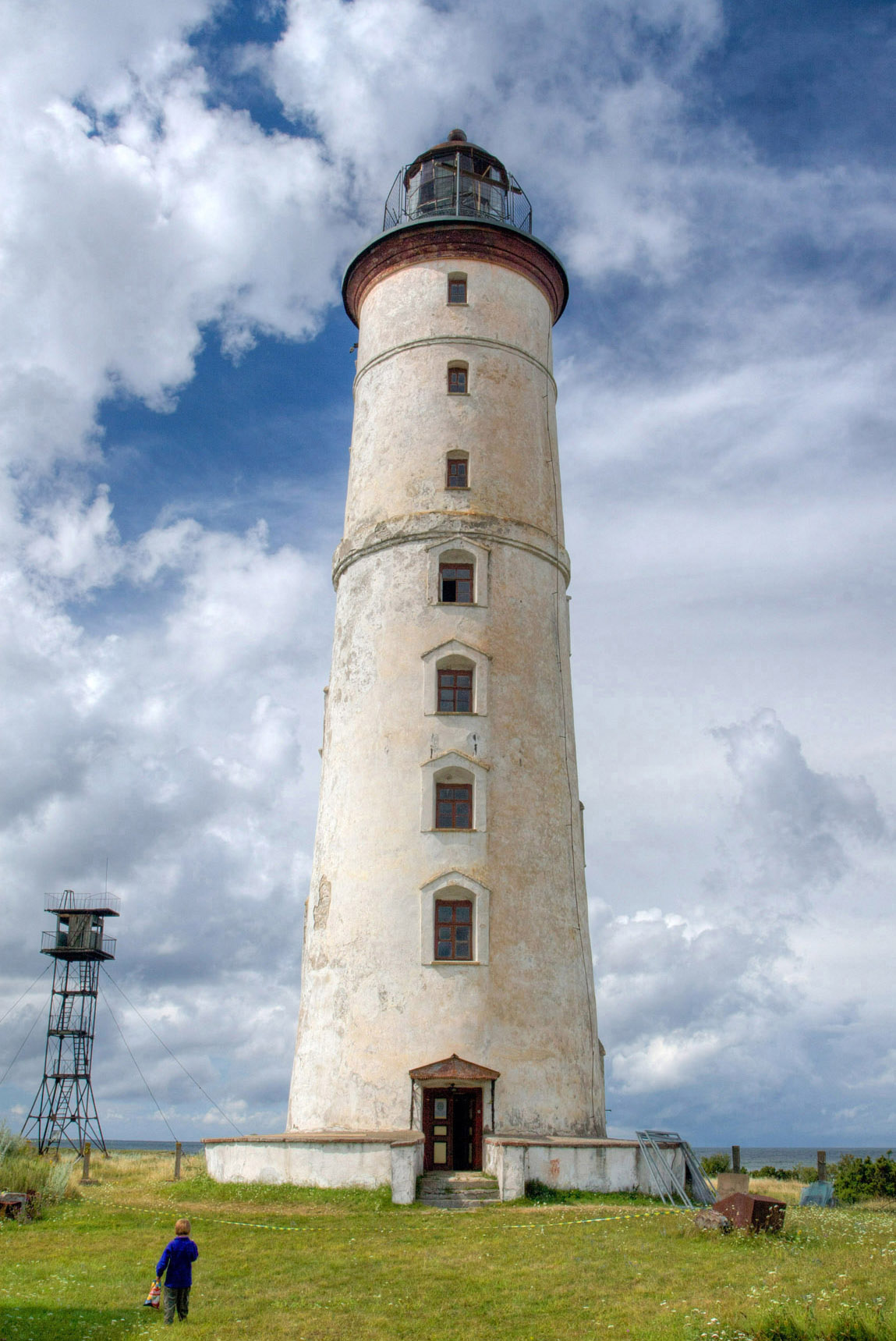
- Location: Vilsandi, Saaremaa Parish, Estonia
- Coordinates: 58°22′58″N 21°48′46″E

Tower
- Constructed: 1809 (first); 1870 (second)
- Construction: stone (tower)
- Height: 37 m (121 ft)
- Shape: cylindrical tower with balcony and lantern
- Markings: white (tower), black (lantern)
- Heritage: architectural monument

Light
- First lit: 1957 (current)
- Focal height: 40 m (130 ft)
- Intensity: 8,000 candela
- Range: 12 nmi (22 km; 14 mi) (white), 6 nmi (11 km; 6.9 mi) (red)
- Characteristic: Fl(3) WR 15s
- Estonia no.: EVA 923

Vilsandi Lighthouse (Estonian: Vilsandi tuletorn) is a lighthouse located on the island of Vilsandi (10 km west of the island of Saaremaa), in Estonia. The lighthouse was built in 1809, making it the oldest lighthouse on the coastline of the Baltic Sea in Saare County. In 1907 the lighthouse keeper became Artur Toom, which founded the first protected area in the small island of Vaika. Artur Toom ended his service of lighthouse keeper in 1941. In 1957 the lighthouse was renovated.

== See also ==
- List of lighthouses in Estonia
