= Ristna Lighthouse =

Lighthouse in Estonia

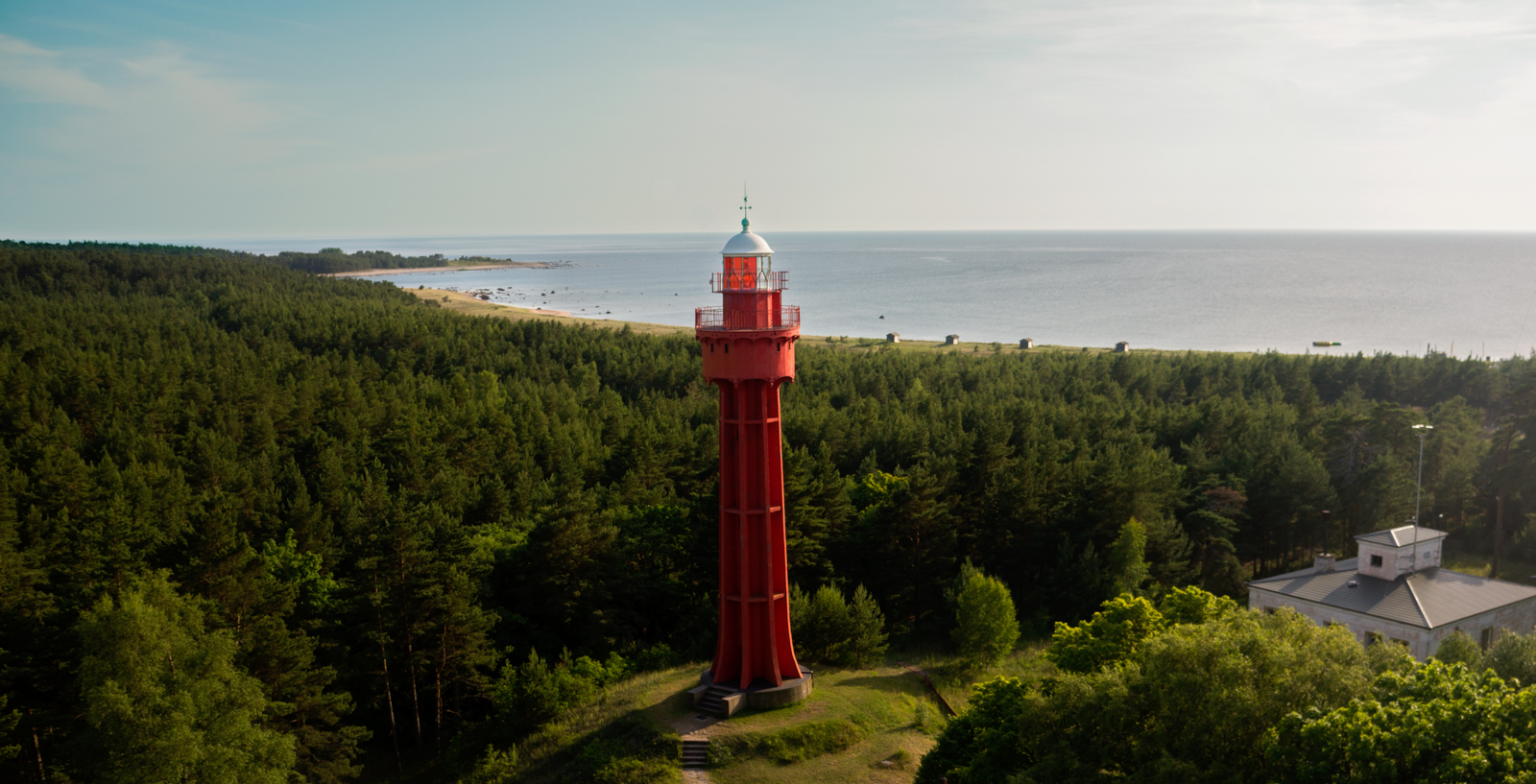
- Location: Hiiumaa, Estonia
- Coordinates: 58°56′24″N 22°03′19″E

Tower
- Constructed: 1874; 152 years ago (first)
- Foundation: concrete base
- Construction: cast iron
- Automated: 1997
- Height: 30 metres (98 ft)
- Shape: hexagonal tower with balcony and lantern
- Markings: red tower and white lantern dome
- Heritage: architectural monument

Light
- First lit: 1920 (current)
- Focal height: 37 metres (121 ft)
- Range: 12 nautical miles (22 km; 14 mi)
- Characteristic: LFl W/R 15 s.
- Estonia no.: EVA 673

The Ristna Lighthouse (Estonian: Ristna tuletorn) is a lighthouse located at Ristna Point on the Kõpu Peninsula on the island of Hiiumaa (on the coast of the Baltic Sea) in Estonia.

== History ==
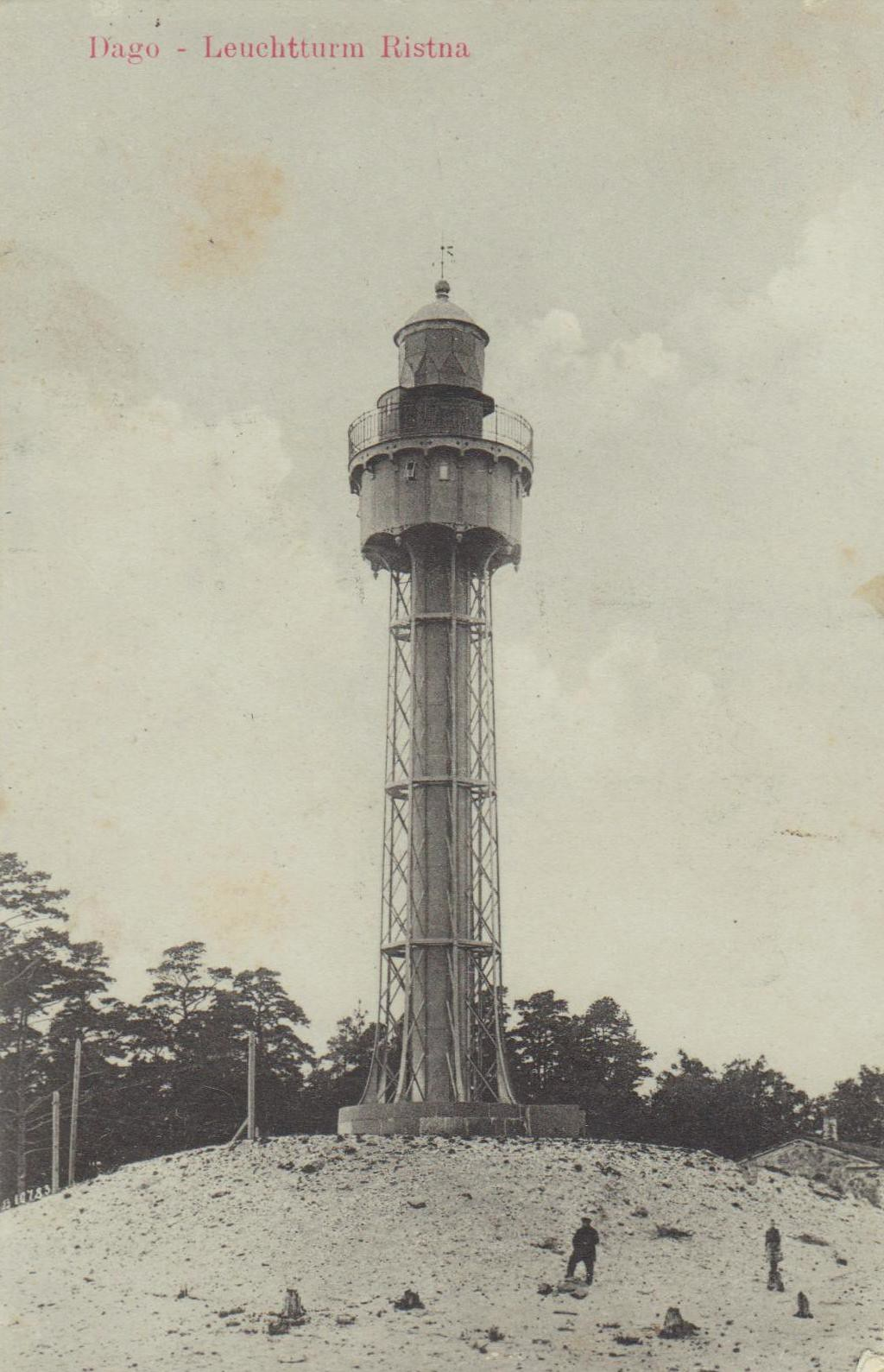
1879

The lighthouse was built in 1874, as a result of constant fogs, which made the old Kõpu lighthouse nearly invisible. The main reason for the decision to build the lighthouse was to warn sailors of drifting sea ice; which caused a major obstacle in the Gulf of Finland. The current iron metal structure of the lighthouse was built in 1874. The design of the Ristna Lighthouse was made by Gustave Eiffel. The lighthouse survived World War I with small amounts of damage; however, to improve the lighthouse's stability, the structure was cast in concrete in 1920.

== See also ==
- List of lighthouses in Estonia
