= Mehikoorma Lighthouse =

Lighthouse in Estonia

Mehikoorma Lighthouse Mehikoorma tuletorn
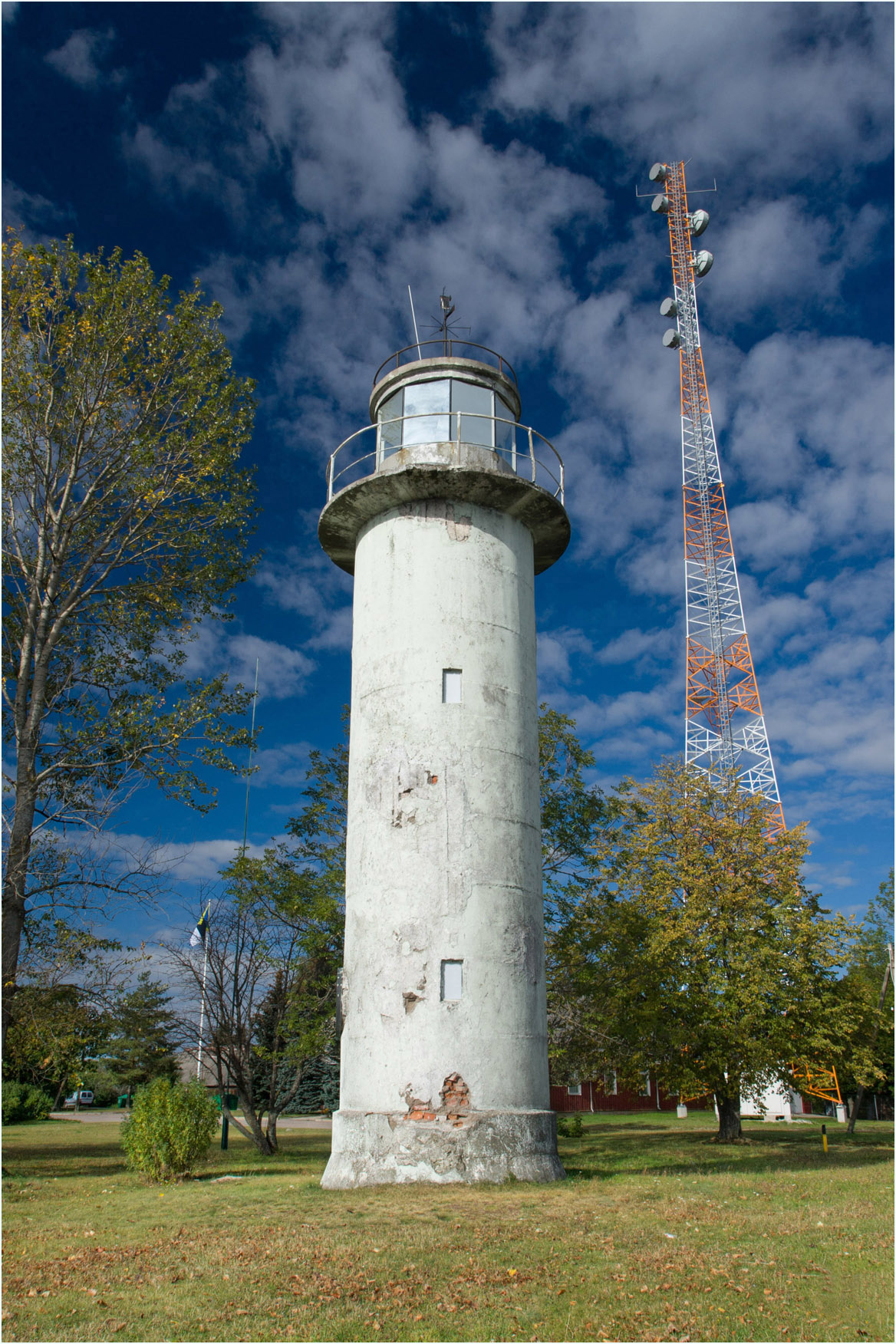
- Location: Räpina Parish, Põlva County, Estonia
- Coordinates: 58.233442°N 27.476530°E

Tower
- Constructed: 1906 (first); 1938 (current)
- Construction: concrete
- Height: 15 metres (49 ft)
- Shape: cylindrical tower with balcony and lantern
- Markings: white painted

Light
- First lit: 1938
- Focal height: 20 metres (66 ft)
- Range: 10 nautical miles (19 km; 12 mi)
- Characteristic: Fl W 4s.
- Estonia no.: EVA P20

Mehikoorma Lighthouse (Estonian: Mehikoorma tuletorn) is a lighthouse located on the western coast, in the southern part of Lake Peipus, Räpina Parish, in Põlva County, in Estonia. The lighthouse was built in 1906. It was originally a wooden structure, but this was replaced with ferroconcrete in 1938. The lighthouse is painted solely in white.

== See also ==
- List of lighthouses in Estonia
