= Pakri Lighthouse =

Lighthouse in Estonia

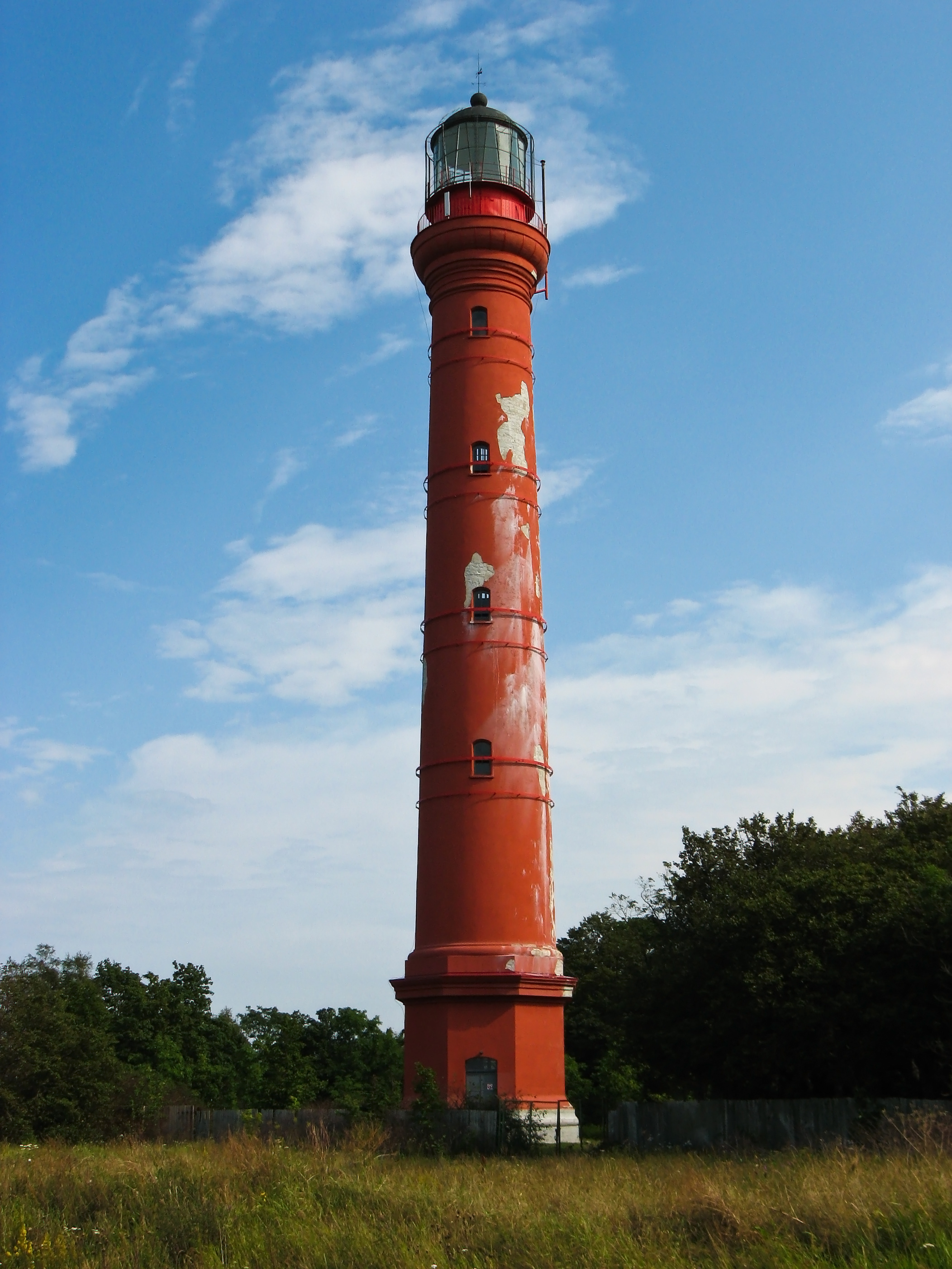
- Location: Pakri Peninsula, Harju County, Estonia
- Coordinates: 59.38740255°N 24.0377221°E

Tower
- Constructed: 1724 (first); 1760 (second); 1808 (third); 1889 (current)
- Construction: brick
- Automated: 1996
- Height: 52 metres (171 ft)
- Shape: cylindrical tower with balcony and lantern
- Markings: red tower and black lantern
- Heritage: architectural monument

Light
- First lit: 1889
- Focal height: 73 metres (240 ft)
- Lens: hyperradiant Fresnel lens
- Range: 12 nautical miles (22 km; 14 mi)
- Characteristic: LFl W 15 s.
- Estonia no.: EVA 380

Pakri lighthouse and surroundings in 2023 April

Pakri Lighthouse (Estonian: Pakri tuletorn) is a lighthouse located on the Pakri Peninsula (on the coast of the Baltic Sea), Harju County, in Estonia.

== History ==
The first known lighthouse to be built on the Pakri Peninsula was in 1724. The location of the lighthouse was allegedly picked by Tsar Peter the Great. In the year of 1889, the current lighthouse, made out of limestone, was built 80 metres away from the old one. The Pakri old lighthouse was partially demolished, and used as a paraffin store. The lighthouse and lighthouse keeper's house were severely damaged during World War II; however, these structures have survived, and in 2001 the lighthouse was fully renovated.

== See also ==
- List of lighthouses in Estonia
