= Virtsu Lighthouse =

Lighthouse in Estonia

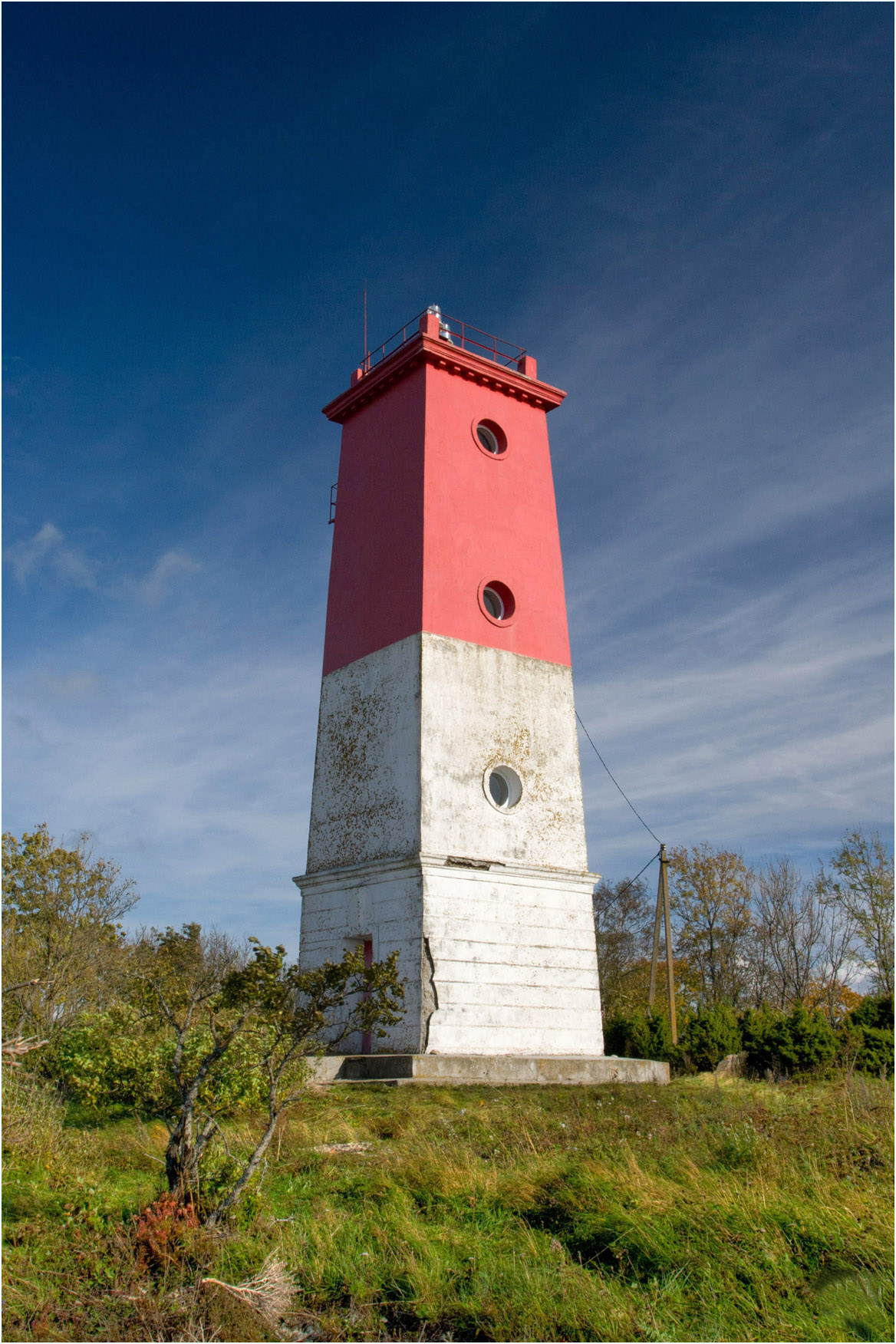
- Location: Virtsu, Lääne County, Estonia
- Coordinates: 58.5672475°N 23.5015997°E

Tower
- Constructed: 1866 (first); 1924 (second)
- Foundation: cement blocks basement
- Construction: concrete
- Height: 18 metres (59 ft)
- Shape: quadrangular tower with balcony and no lantern
- Markings: red upper half and white lower half

Light
- First lit: 1951 (current)
- Focal height: 19 metres (62 ft)
- Range: 11 nautical miles (20 km; 13 mi)
- Characteristic: Fl W 5 s. (1.5+3.5=5s)
- Estonia no.: EVA 780

Virtsu Lighthouse (Estonian: Virtsu tuletorn) is a lighthouse located in Virtsu, Lääne County, in Estonia. The lighthouse is used as a signal for the Suur Strait.

== History ==
The decision to build the lighthouse was in the year of 1856. The lighthouse began being built in 1863 and the 28-metre lighthouse was complete in 1866. In 1881 the lighthouse was reconstructed and in 1900 the reflector apparatus was replaced. During the course of World War I, the lighthouse was destroyed in 1917. In 1924 a new lighthouse was built, with a height of 18 metres, and a diameter of 2.5 metres; with a glare configuration of: 0.4 s on, 3.6 off. The lighthouse was coloured in white (lower half) and red (upper half). In 1944 the lighthouse was demolished when the Wehrmacht retreated; a year later a temporary automatic glare eight metre lighthouse was constructed with a focal height of 11 metres and a range of 11 nautical miles. In 1951 the current 18 metre reinforced concrete lighthouse was built. In 1971 the reflector apparatus was replaced and the glare configuration of: 1.5 s on, 3.5 s off.

== See also ==
- List of lighthouses in Estonia
