= Naissaar Lighthouse =

Lighthouse in Estonia

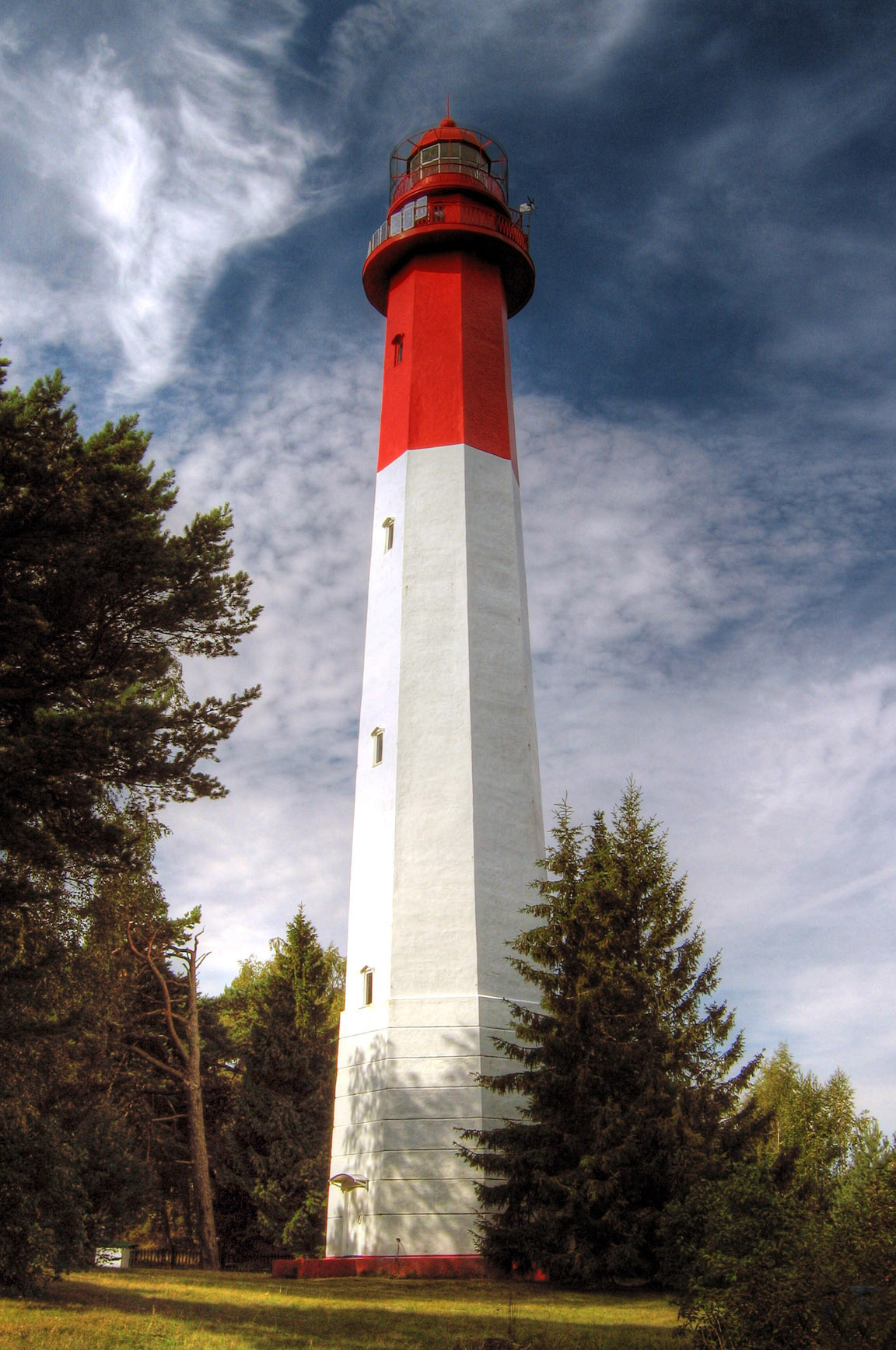
- Location: Naissaar, Viimsi Parish, Estonia
- Coordinates: 59°36′13.6″N 24°30′38.5″E

Tower
- Constructed: 1788 (first)
- Construction: concrete
- Automated: 2004
- Height: 45 metres (148 ft)
- Shape: octagonal prism tower with double balcony and lantern
- Markings: white lower 2/3 and red the upper 1/3

Light
- First lit: 1960 (current)
- Focal height: 47.6 metres (156 ft)
- Range: 12 nautical miles (22 km; 14 mi)
- Characteristic: LFl W 10 s.
- Estonia no.: EVA 320

Naissaar Lighthouse (Estonian: Naissaare tuletorn) is a lighthouse located on the Estonian island of Naissaar in the Gulf of Finland.

== History ==
The first lighthouses on the island of Naissaar were built in 1788, consisting of beacons on the northernmost and southernmost points of the island. The deteriorating northernmost lighthouse was replaced by a limestone structure in 1849. This lighthouse was heavily damaged during the Crimean War, however it was reconstructed in 1856. The stone lighthouse was destroyed by Soviet troops in 1941, during World War II. Following the war, a temporary wooden lighthouse operated between 1946 and 1960, after which a 45-metre reinforced concrete lighthouse was built in its place. The lantern room was installed in 1999. The lighthouse stands as a landmark in the traditional style of Estonian lighthouses. It was automated, with the lighthouse's keeper leaving service in 2004.

== See also ==
- List of lighthouses in Estonia
