= Sääretükk Lighthouse =

Lighthouse in Estonia

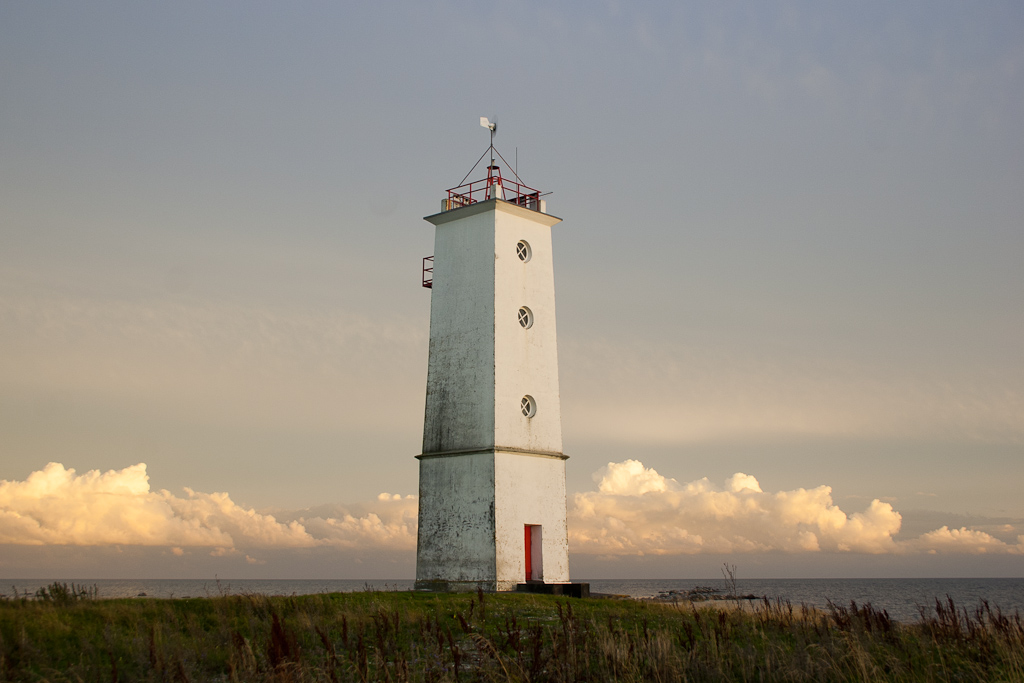
- Location: Saaremaa, Estonia
- Coordinates: 58.260767°N 22.821027°E

Tower
- Constructed: 1954
- Foundation: concrete base
- Construction: concrete
- Automated: 1995
- Height: 15 metres (49 ft)
- Shape: square tower with balcony and no lantern
- Markings: white tower
- Power source: solar power

Light
- First lit: 1954
- Focal height: 19 metres (62 ft)
- Range: 6 nautical miles (11 km; 6.9 mi)
- Characteristic: Fl(3) W 15 s.
- Estonia no.: EVA 977

Sääretükk Lighthouse (Estonian: Sääretüki tuletorn) is a lighthouse located on the island of Saaremaa, in Estonia. The lighthouse was built in 1954, with a concrete structure. With an automatic glare configuration since 1995, with the sequence of: 0.5 s on, 1 s off, 0.5 s on, 8 s off.

== See also ==
- List of lighthouses in Estonia
