= Abruka Lighthouse =

Lighthouse in Estonia

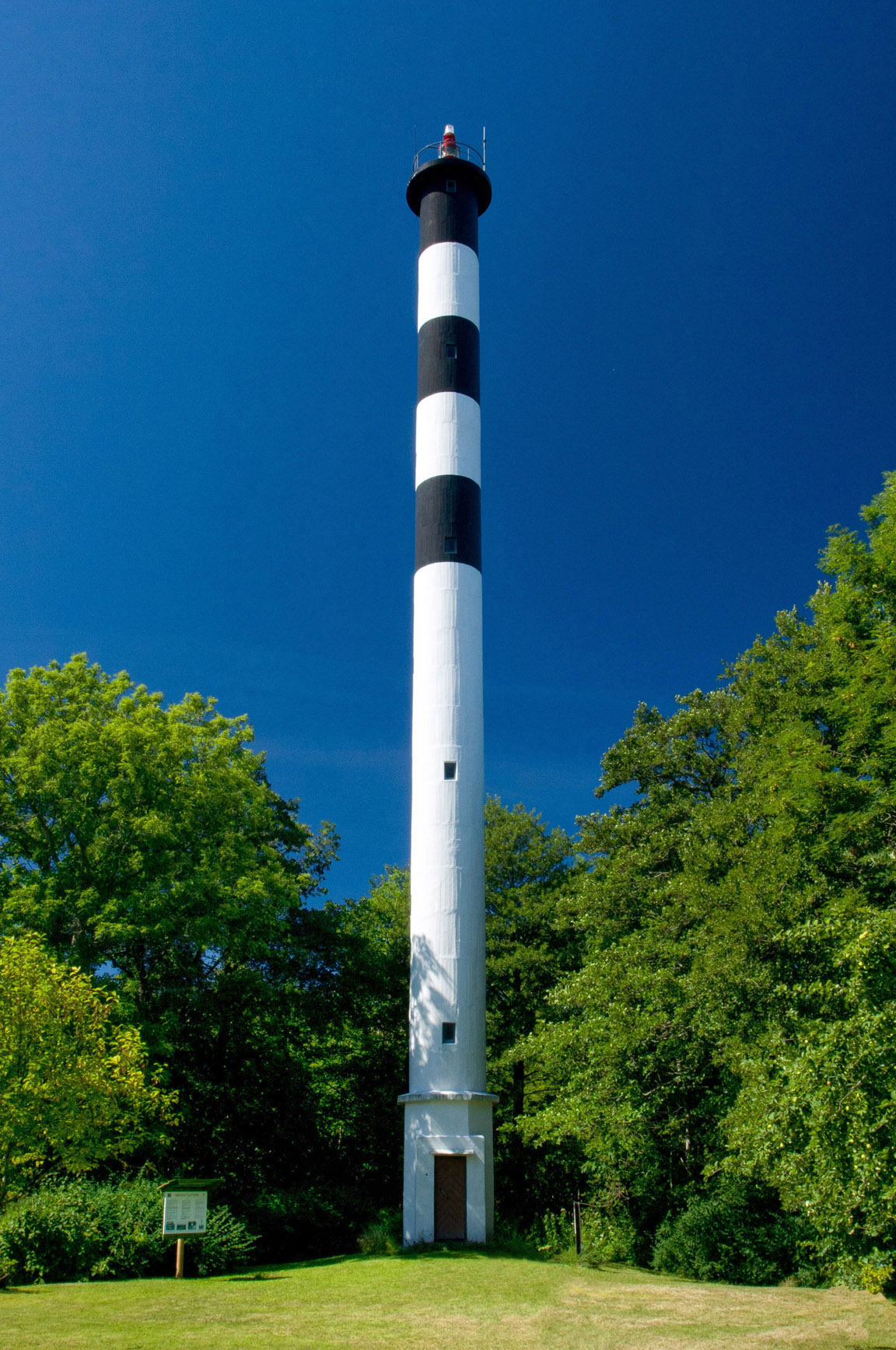
- Location: Abruka, Saaremaa, Estonia
- Coordinates: 58.149089°N 22.524629°E

Tower
- Constructed: 1931
- Construction: concrete tower
- Height: 36 metres (118 ft)
- Shape: cylindrical tower with balcony and no lantern
- Markings: white tower with three black horizontal bands

Light
- First lit: 1931
- Focal height: 38 metres (125 ft)
- Range: 9 nautical miles (17 km; 10 mi)
- Characteristic: Iso W 4s.
- Estonia no.: EVA 972

Abruka Lighthouse (Estonian: Abruka tagumine tuletorn) is a lighthouse located on the island of Abruka, in the region of Saaremaa in western Estonia.

The first lighthouse in Abruka was built in 1897, a 28-metre-high (92 ft) wooden structure, which had a form of a trellised wooden candelabrum. The current lighthouse was built in 1931, replacing the former wooden structure; the current lighthouse was designed by engineer Ferdinand Adoff, and constructed by Arronet and Boustedt. The lighthouse is 36 metres high, but only 2 metres in diameter, with its cylindrical reinforced concrete structure painted white with three black bands.

== See also ==
- List of lighthouses in Estonia
