= Tahkuna Lighthouse =

Lighthouse in Estonia

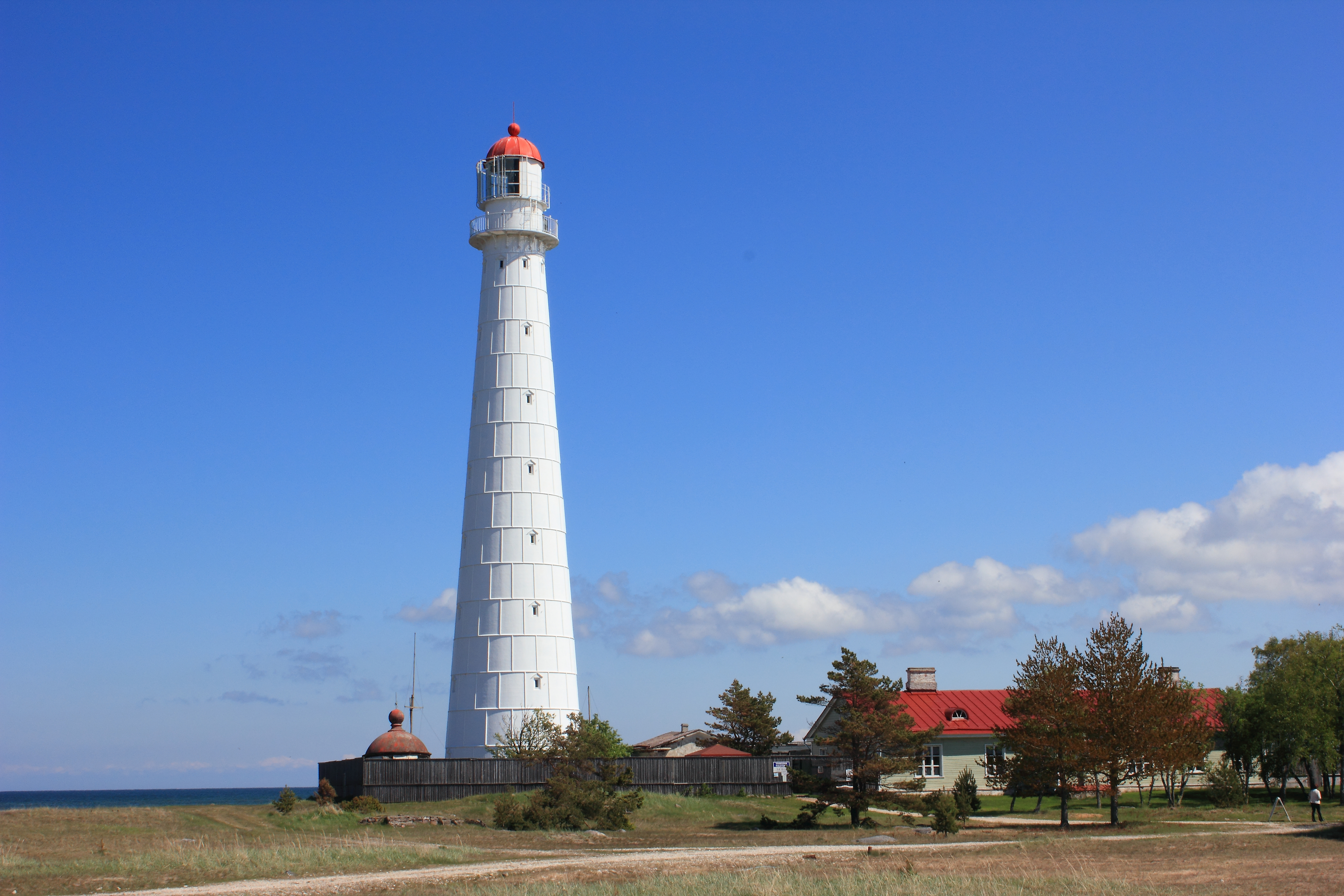
- Location: Hiiumaa, Estonia
- Coordinates: 59°05′29″N 22°35′10″E

Tower
- Constructed: 1875 (first)
- Foundation: cement blocks
- Construction: cast iron
- Height: 43 metres (141 ft)
- Shape: cylindrical tower with balcony and lantern
- Markings: white tower and red lantern dome
- Heritage: architectural monument

Light
- First lit: 1998 (current)
- Focal height: 43 metres (141 ft)
- Range: 12 nautical miles (22 km; 14 mi)
- Characteristic: LFl(2) W 15 s. (2+2+2+9=15 s.)
- Estonia no.: EVA 645

Tahkuna Lighthouse (Estonian: Tahkuna tuletorn) is a lighthouse located in the Tahkuna Peninsula, Hiiu Parish, on the island of Hiiumaa, in Estonia.

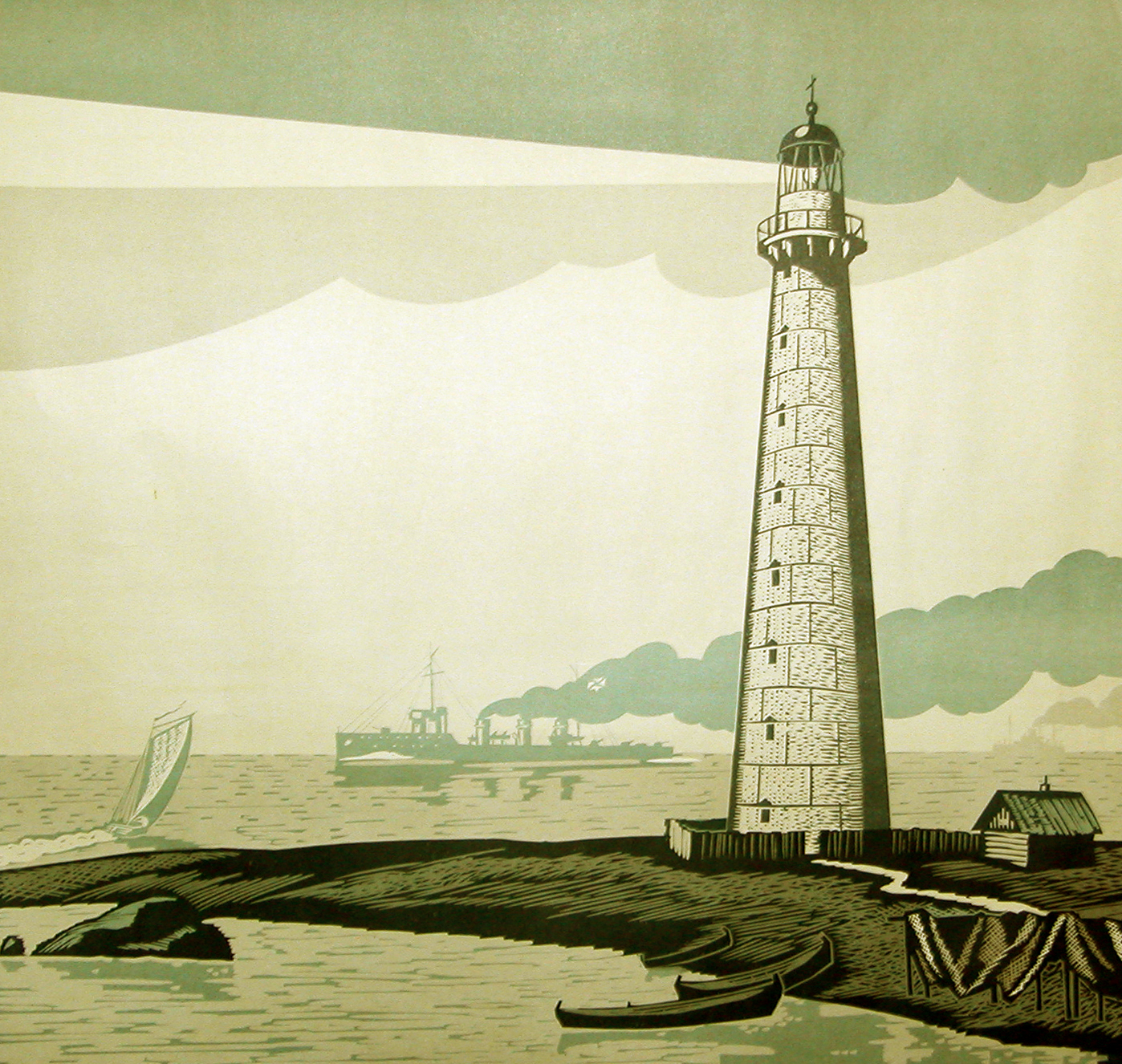
Tahkuna Lighthouse by Vyacheslav Ovchinnikov

== History ==
The construction of the lighthouse began in 1873. The lighthouse has a metal structure, designed by British Alexander Gordon. The prefabricated structure of the lighthouse was made in France in 1873, and constructed in 1875, in the current location. The lighthouse has a height of 42.6 metres, and is the tallest of this type structure in Estonia. Since its construction the lighthouse has remained unchanged.

== See also ==
- List of lighthouses in Estonia
