= Letipea Lighthouse =

Lighthouse in Estonia

Letipea Lighthouse Letipea tuletorn
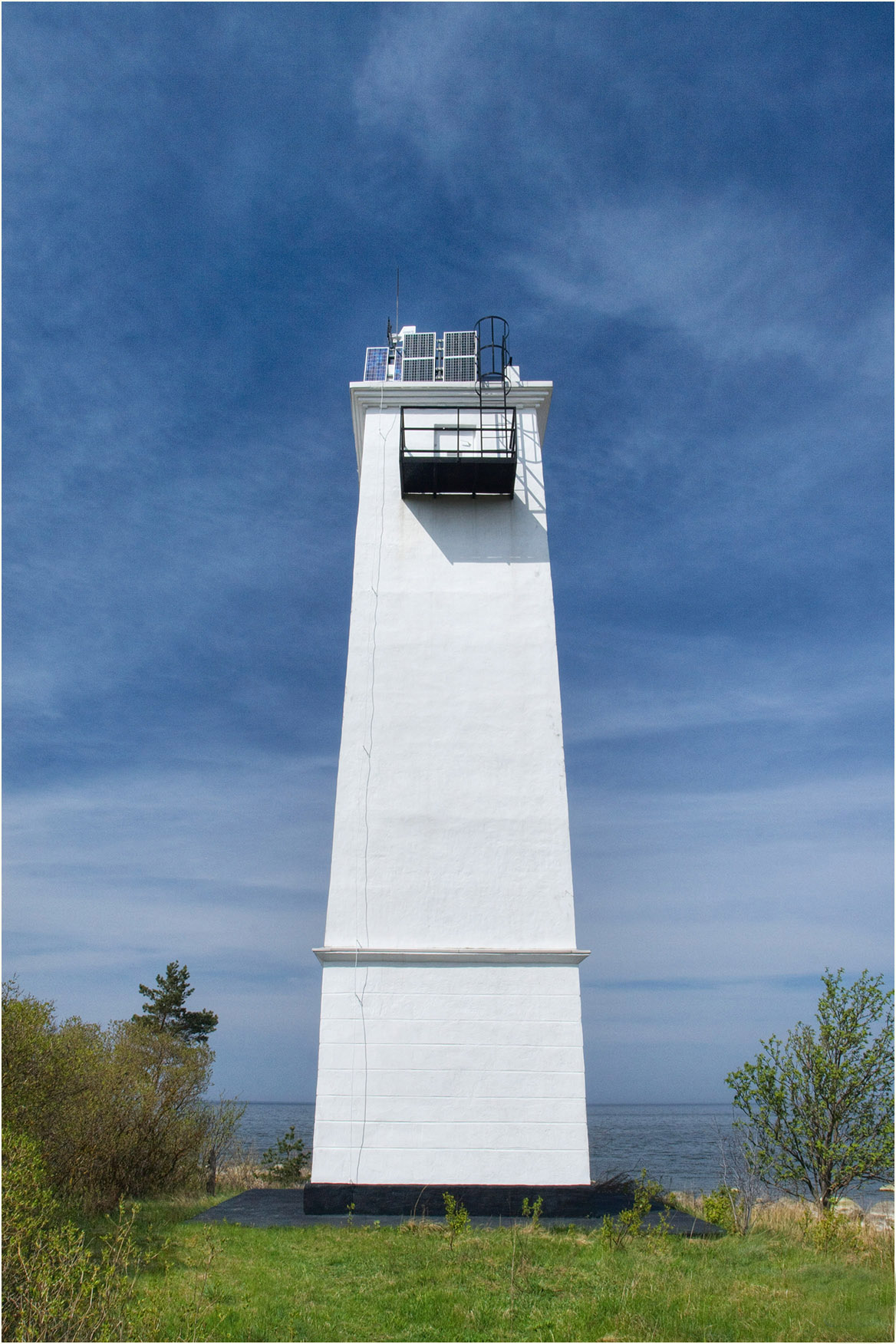
- Location: Viru-Nigula Parish, Lääne-Viru County, Estonia
- Coordinates: 59°33′09″N 26°36′25″E

Tower
- Constructed: 1815 (first); 1936 (second)
- Construction: concrete
- Automated: 1995
- Height: 15 metres (49 ft)
- Shape: square truncated tower with balcony and no lantern
- Markings: white tower
- Power source: solar power

Light
- First lit: 1951 (current)
- Focal height: 18.8 metres (62 ft)
- Range: 7 nautical miles (13 km; 8.1 mi)
- Characteristic: Fl (4) W 18 s.
- Estonia no.: EVA 040

Letipea Lighthouse (Estonian: Letipea tuletorn) is a lighthouse located in Letipea Point, Viru-Nigula Parish, Lääne-Viru County, in Estonia.

The lighthouse has a height of fifteen metres.

== See also ==
- List of lighthouses in Estonia
