= Mäebe, Saare County =

Village in Estonia

Coordinates: 57°58′08″N 22°08′24″E

Mäebe
- Village
- Interactive map of Mäebe
- Country: Estonia
- County: Saare County
- Parish: Saaremaa Parish

Population (2011)
  - Total: 26
- Time zone: UTC+2 (EET)
  - Summer (DST): UTC+3 (EEST)

Mäebe is a village in Saaremaa Parish, Saare County in western Estonia.
