= Hindu, Hiiu County =

Village in Estonia

Hindu
- Village
- Location within Estonia
- Coordinates: 58°42′09″N 22°29′45″E
- Country: Estonia
- County: Hiiu County
- Parish: Hiiumaa Parish
- Time zone: UTC+2 (EET)
  - Summer (DST): UTC+3 (EEST)

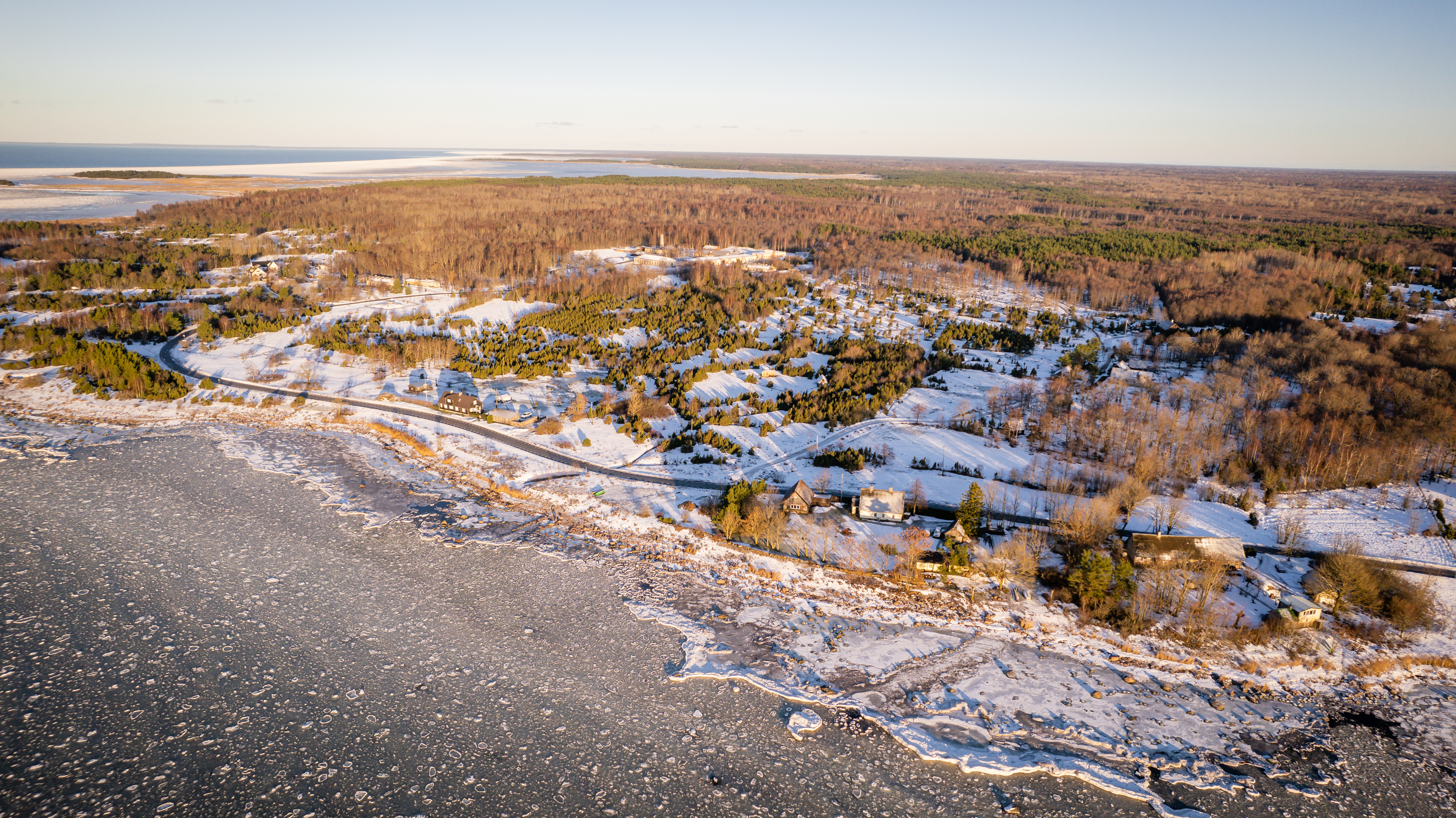
Hindu

Hindu is a village in Hiiumaa Parish, Hiiu County in northwestern Estonia.

The village was first mentioned in 1832 (Hindo). Historically, the village was part of Emmaste Manor (German: Emmast).

From 1977 to 1997, Hindu was part of the village of Sõru.
