= Kübassaare Lighthouse =

Lighthouse in Estonia

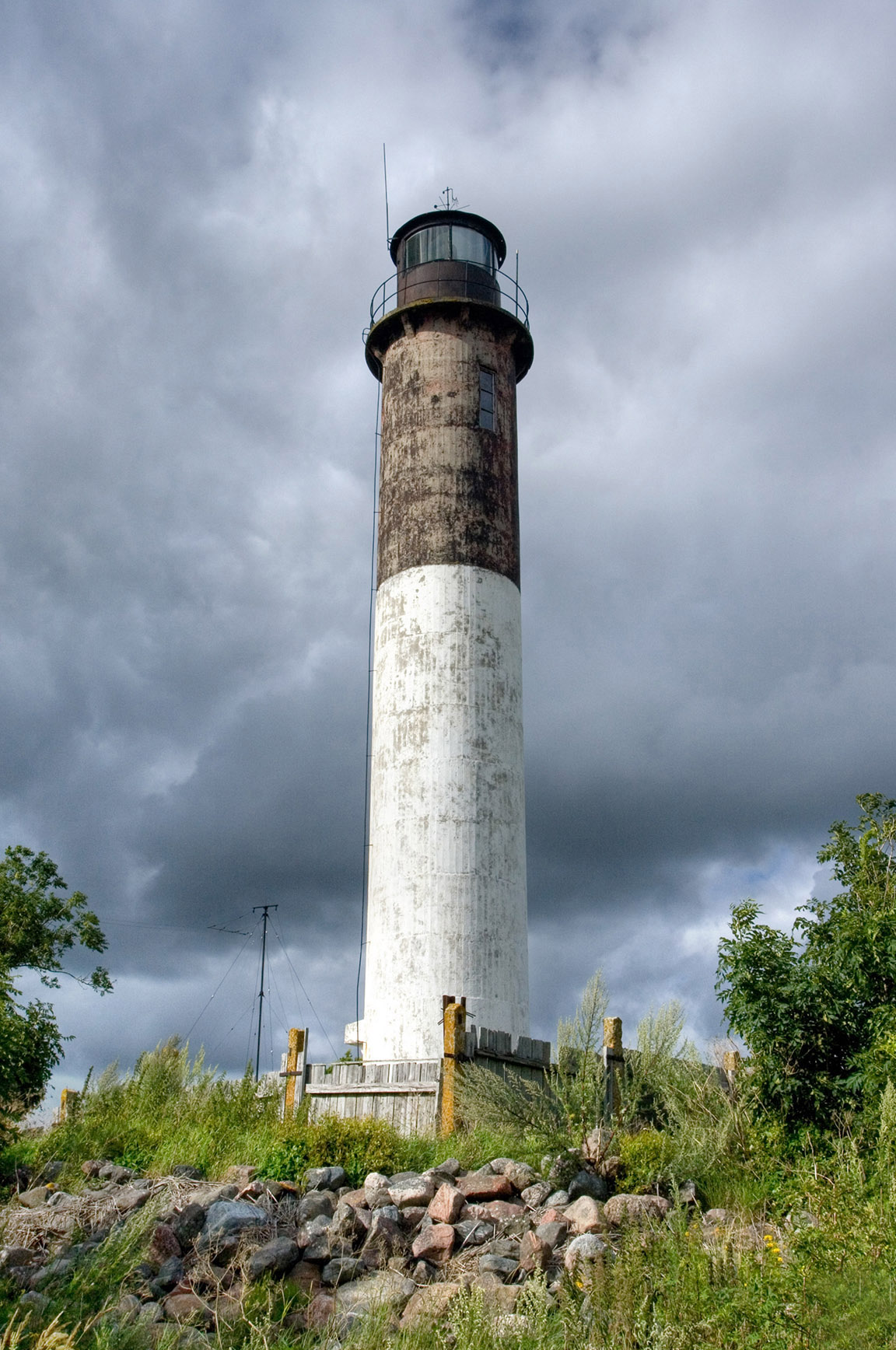
- Location: Kübassaare; Saaremaa; Estonia
- Coordinates: 58°25′42.3″N 23°17′59.7″E

Tower
- Constructed: 1916 (first); 1924 (second)
- Construction: concrete tower
- Height: 18 metres (59 ft)
- Shape: cylindrical tower with balcony and lantern
- Power source: mains electricity

Light
- First lit: 1939 (rebuilt)
- Focal height: 20 metres (66 ft)
- Range: 9 nautical miles (17 km; 10 mi)
- Characteristic: LFl W 9s,
- Estonia no.: EVA 987

Kübassaare Lighthouse (Estonian: Kübassaare tuletorn) is a lighthouse located in Kübassaare Peninsula, in the easternmost point of Saaremaa; in Estonia. The lighthouse is 18 metres in height, a round cylindrical concrete tower with a lantern and gallery. The current lighthouse had a height of 11 metres, before it was extended to 18 metres in 1939. The lighthouse has a glare configuration of: 2.5 s glare, 6.5 s off.

== See also ==
- List of lighthouses in Estonia
