= Kübassaare =

Village in Estonia

Coordinates: 58°26′N 23°19′E

- Village
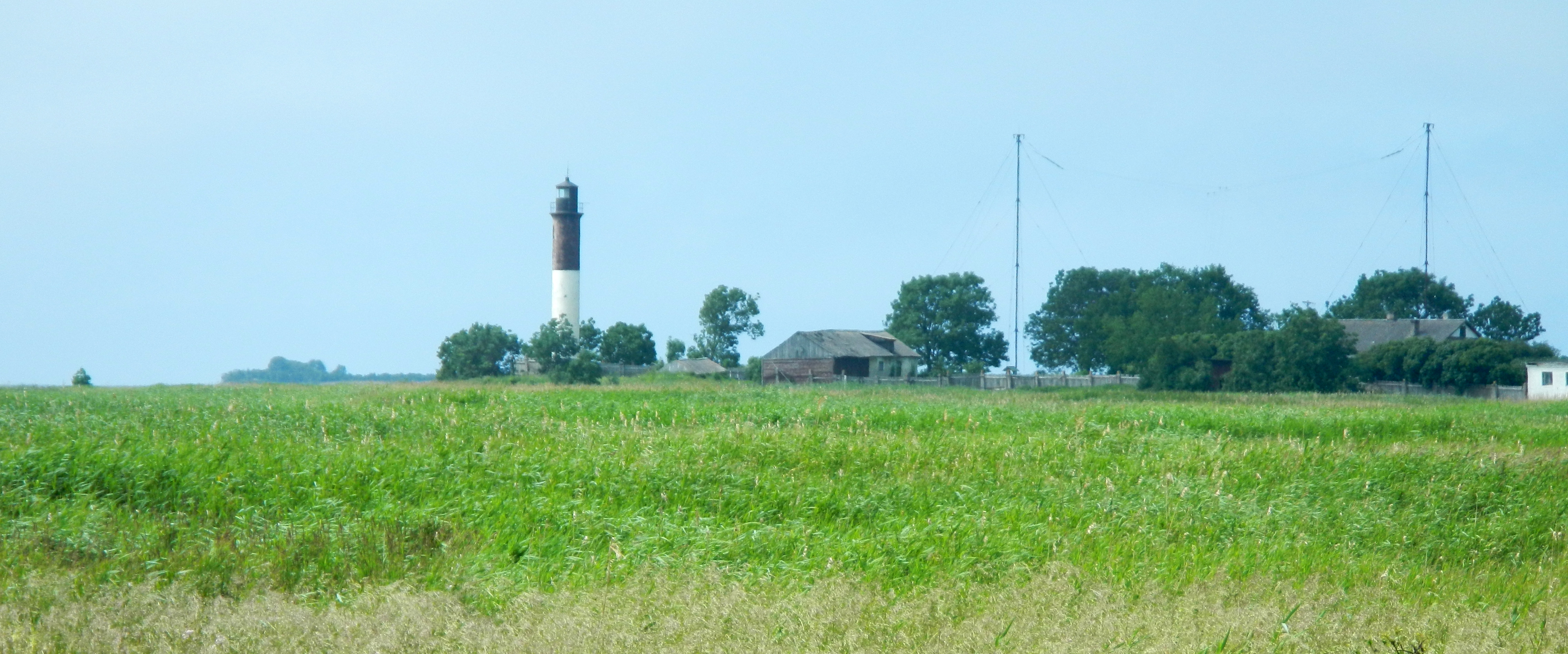
- Kübassaare viewed from the north
- Interactive map of Kübassaare
- Country: Estonia
- County: Saare County
- Parish: Saaremaa Parish
- Time zone: UTC+2 (EET)
  - Summer (DST): UTC+3 (EEST)

Kübassaare is a village in Saaremaa Parish, Saaremaa in Saare County, western Estonia.

Before the administrative reform in 2017, the village was in Pöide Parish.

Kübassaare Lighthouse is located in the village.
