= Anseküla =

Village in Estonia

- Village
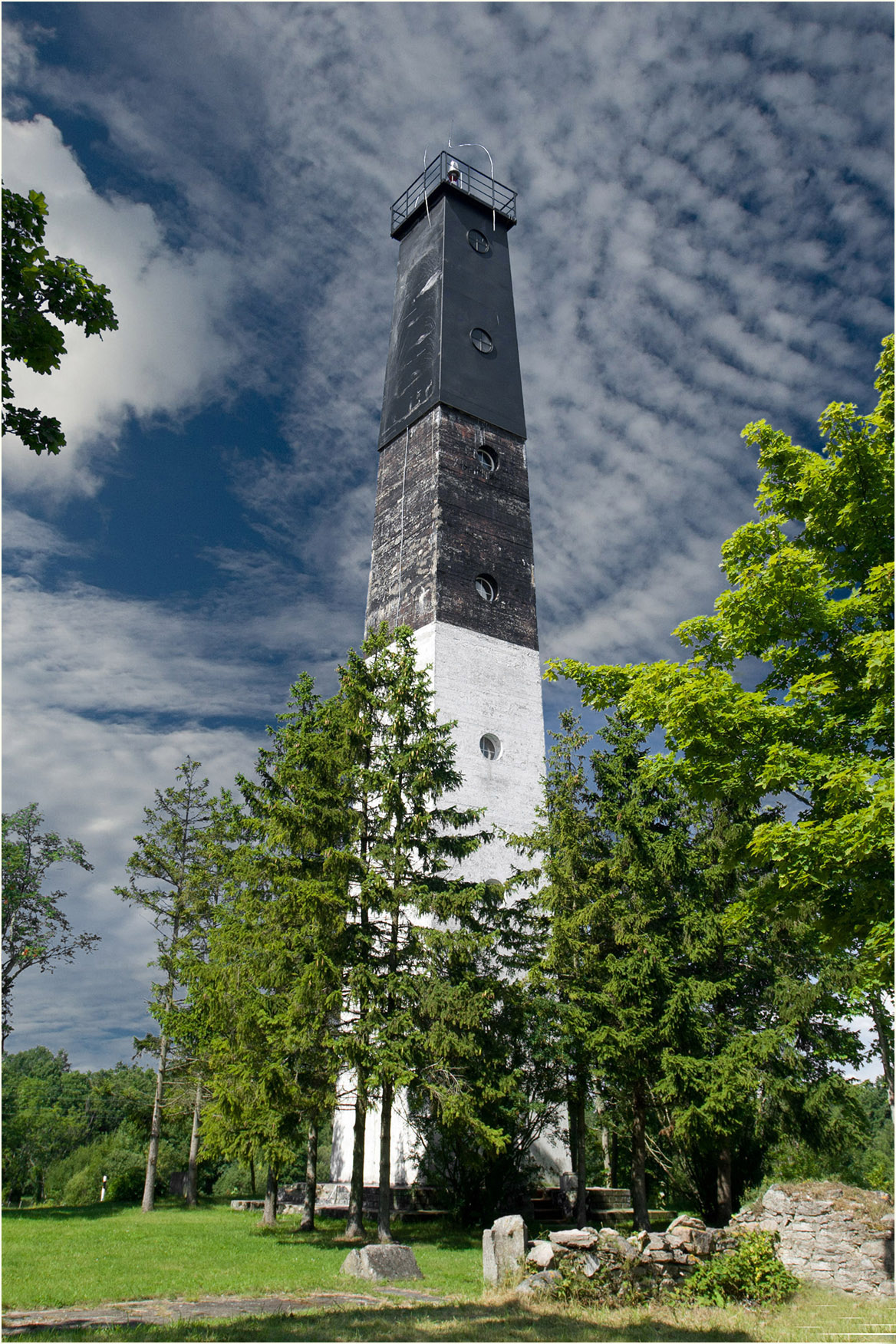
- Anseküla lighthouse.

- Location in Estonia
- Coordinates: 58°05′29″N 22°13′39″E
- Country: Estonia
- County: Saare County
- Municipality: Saaremaa Parish

Population (2011 Census)
  - Total: 39

Anseküla (German: Anseküll) is a village in Saaremaa Parish, Saare County, Estonia, on the island of Saaremaa. As of the 2011 census, the settlement's population was 39.

The first church in Anseküla was built around 1300. From 1846 to 1875, Martin Körber was the pastor in Anseküla. During Körber's tenure, the church was reconstructed in 1864. The rebuilt church was destroyed in 1944 during World War II. A lighthouse was later built at the former location of the church, but the church's graveyard is still in use.

== Gallery ==
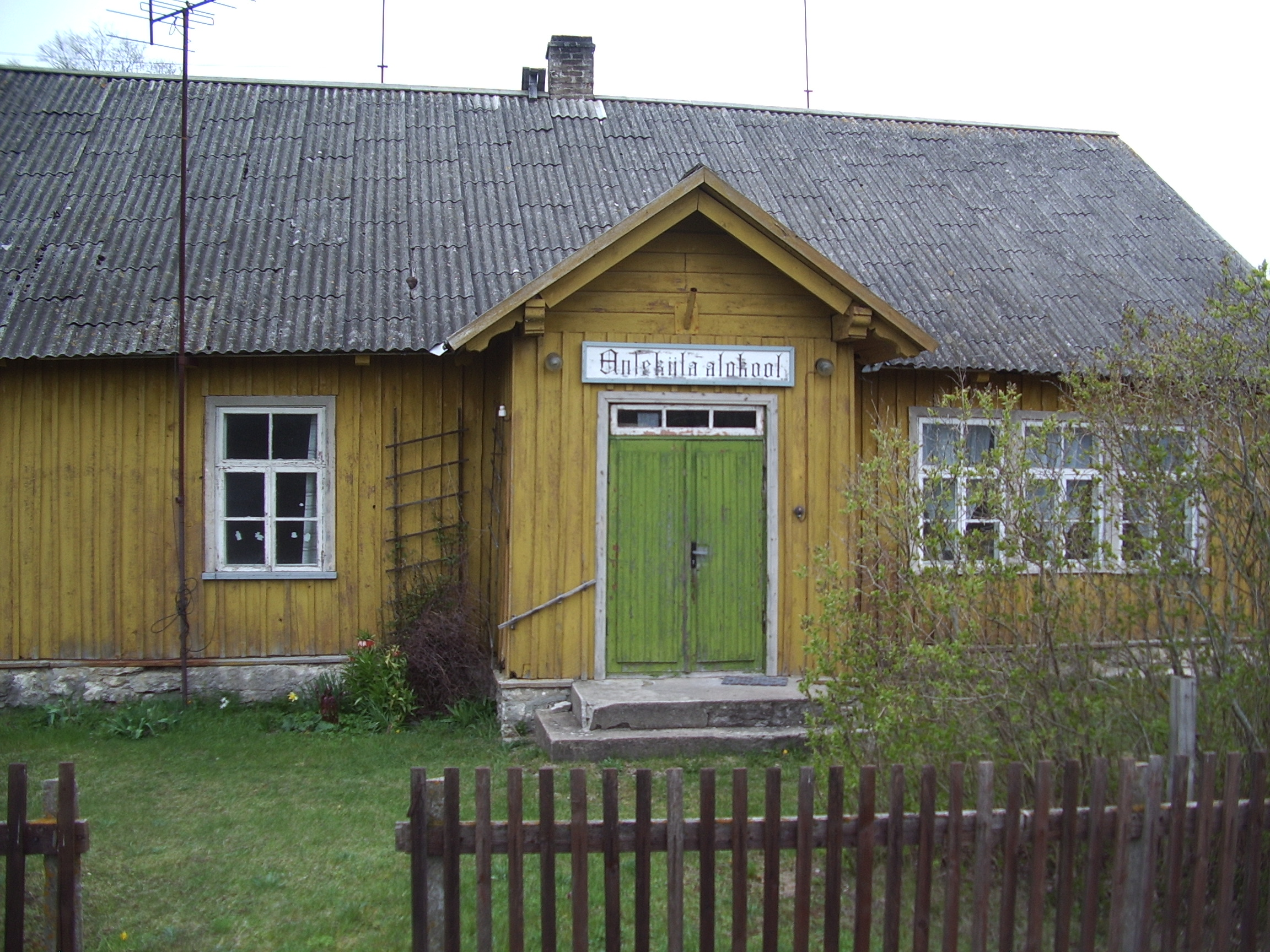
Former Anseküla primary school.

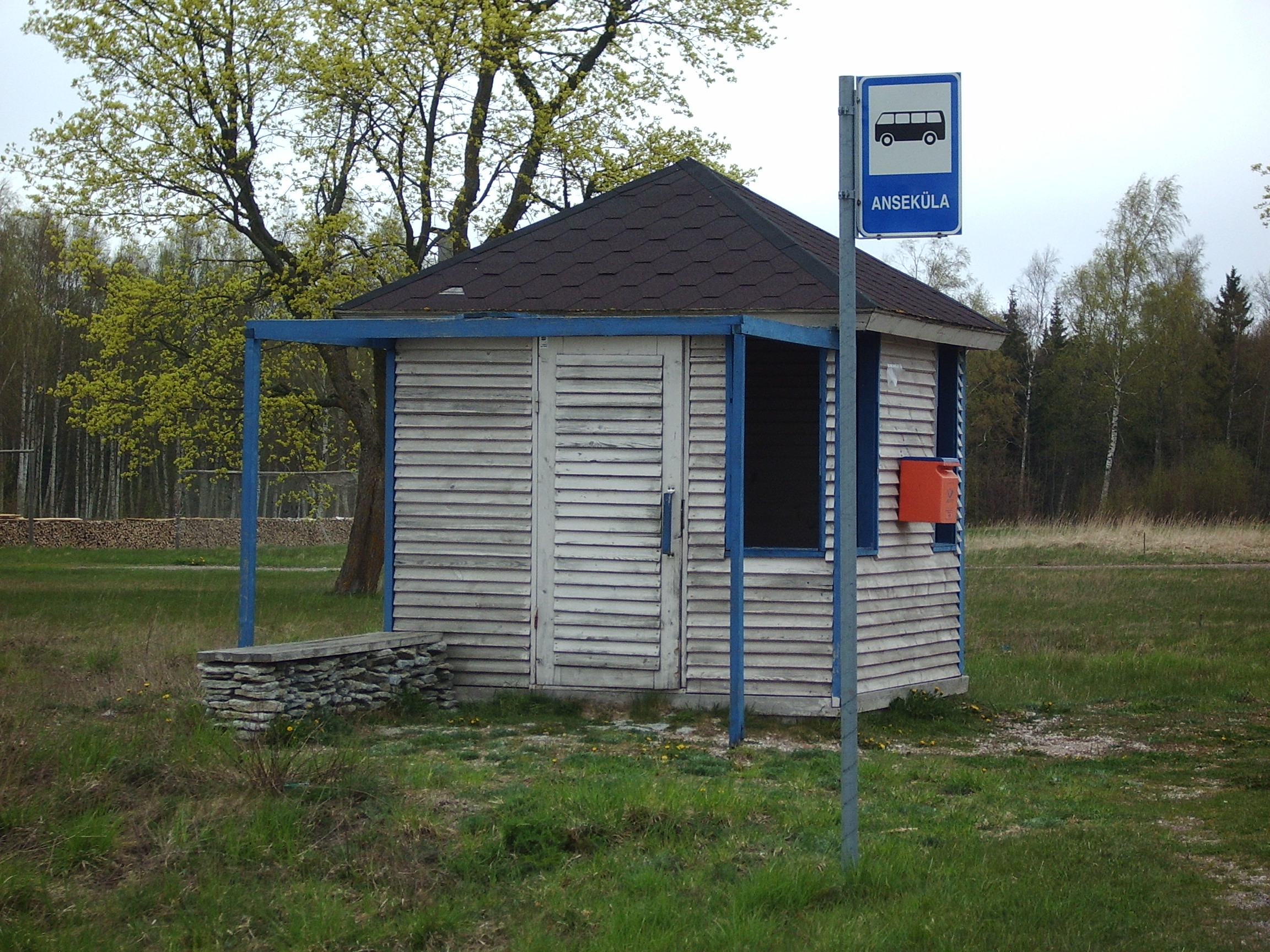
Anseküla bus stop.

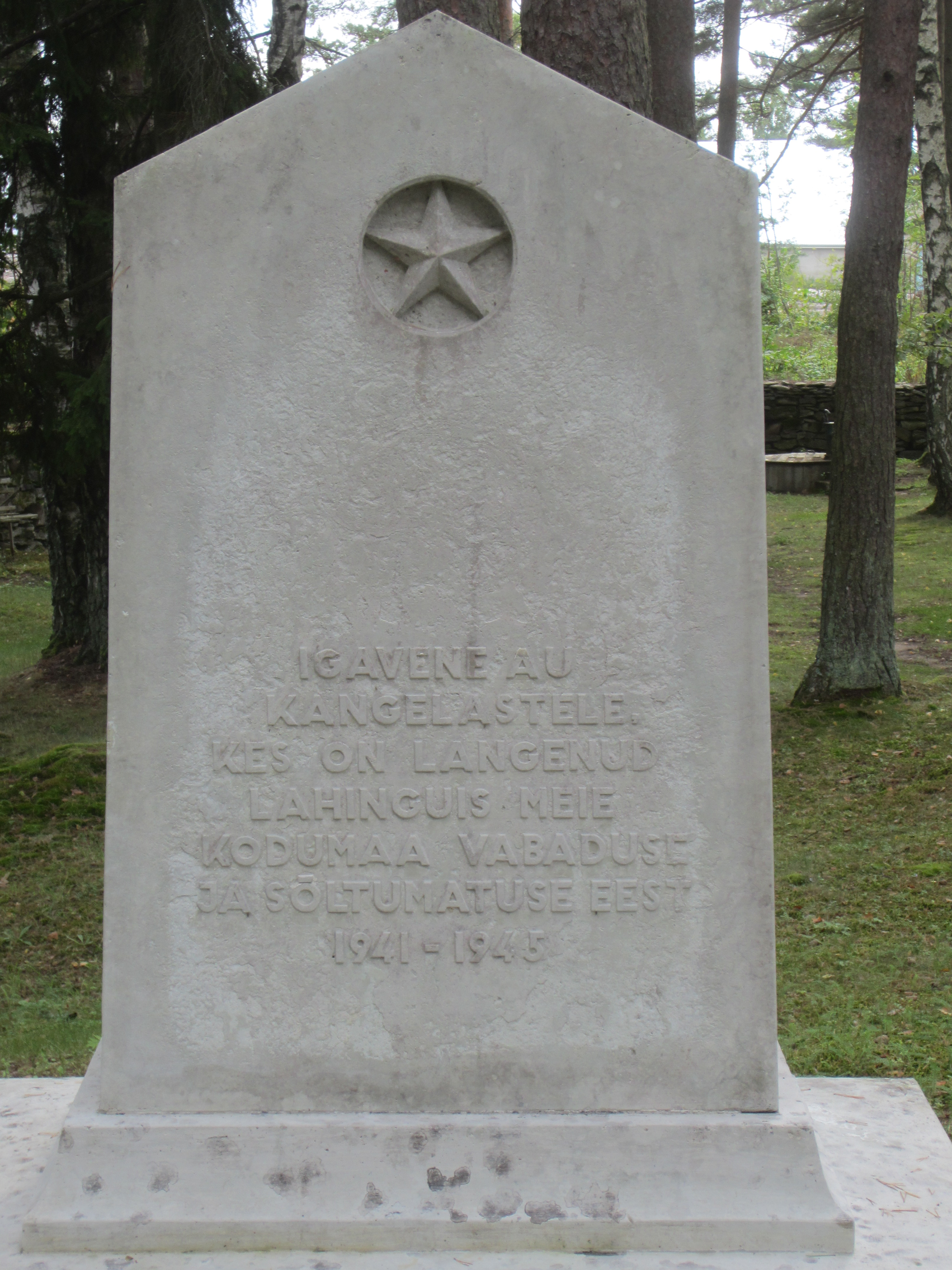
World War II memorial.

Before the administrative reform in 2017, the village was in Salme Parish.
