= Kaavi, Estonia =

Village in Estonia

Coordinates: 57°59′N 22°11′E

Kaavi
- Village
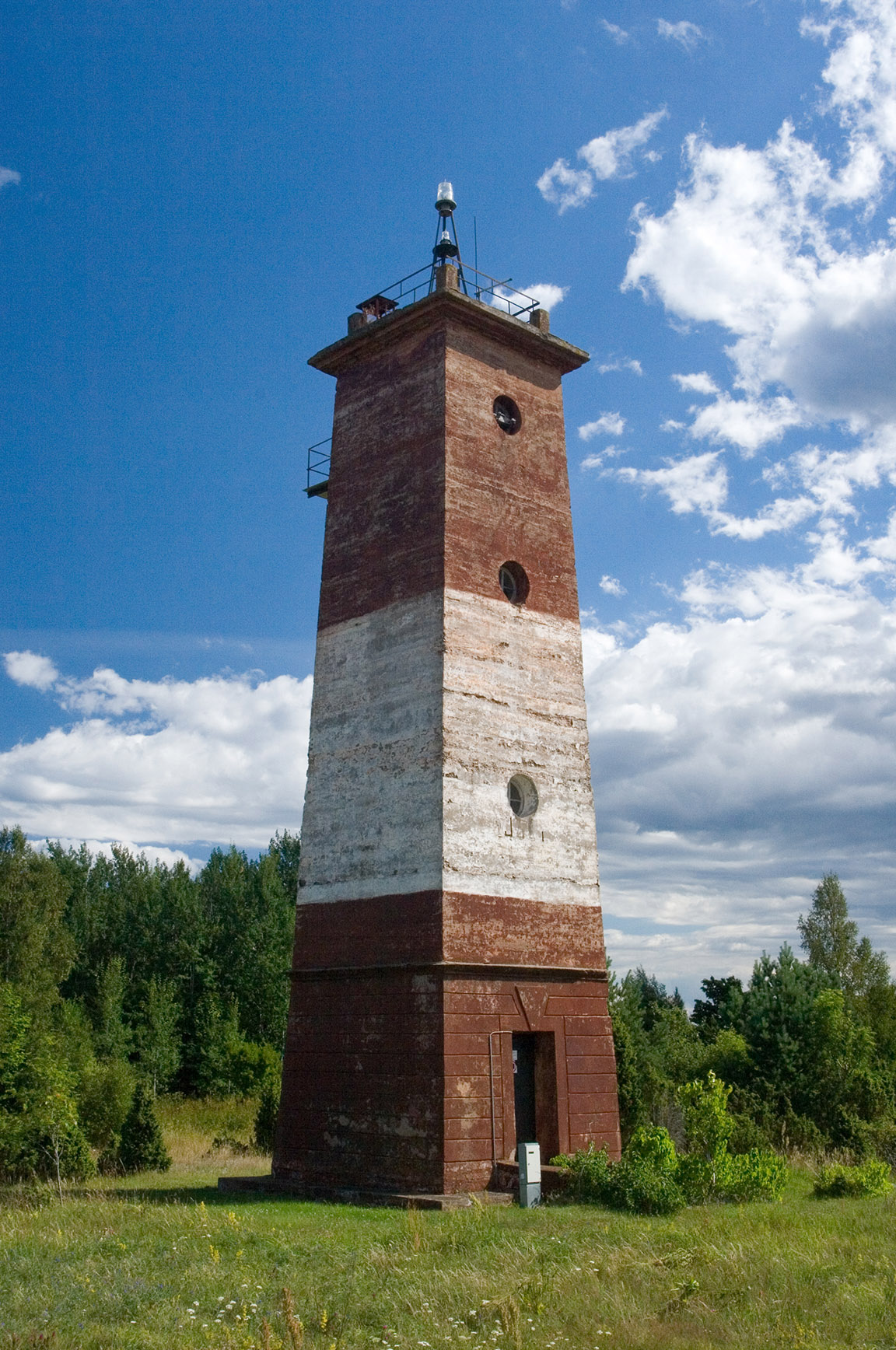
- Kaavi lighthouse
- Interactive map of Kaavi
- Country: Estonia
- County: Saare County
- Parish: Saaremaa Parish
- Time zone: UTC+2 (EET)
  - Summer (DST): UTC+3 (EEST)

Kaavi is a village in Saaremaa Parish, Saare County in western Estonia.

Kaavi counts 15 inhabitants (from 2021 census) and has an area of 5352 square kilometers.
