= Mohni =

Island in Estonia

Coordinates: 59°41′N 25°48′E

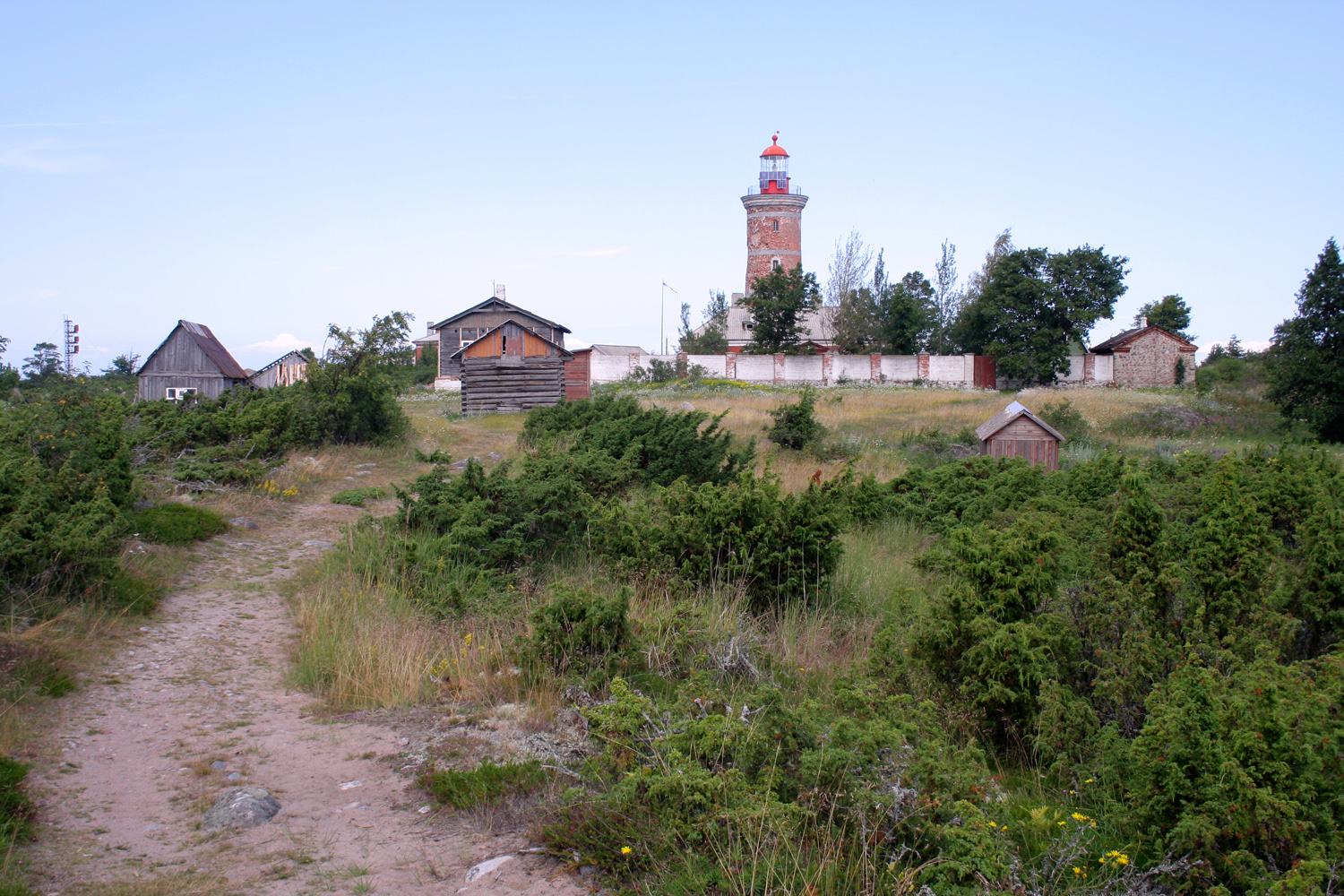
Mohni

Mohni (Swedish: Ekholm) is an island of Estonia. It limits the Eru Bay from the north. The closest settlement at the mainland is Viinistu.

Mohni is part of Lahemaa National Park.

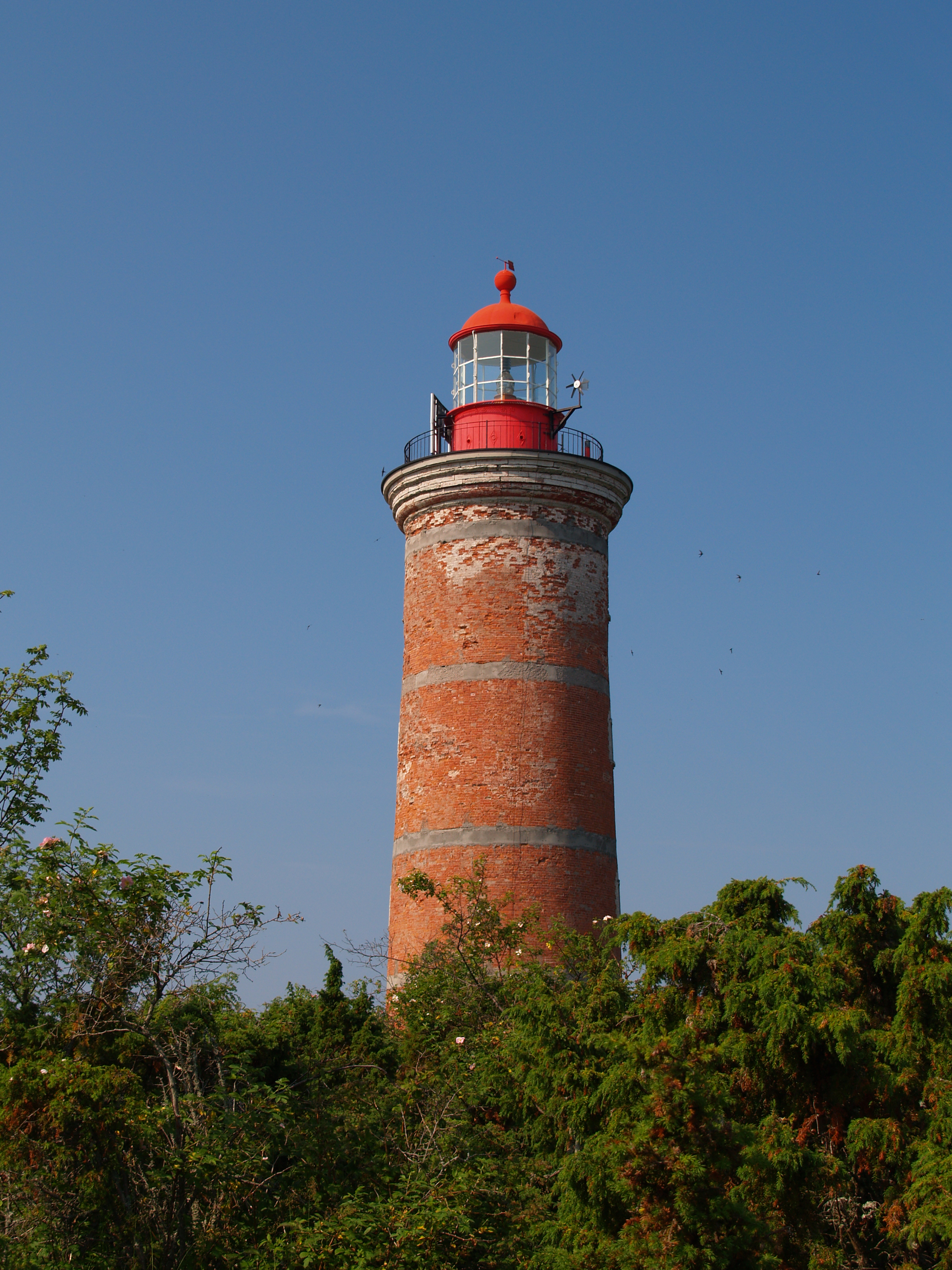
Mohni lighthouse

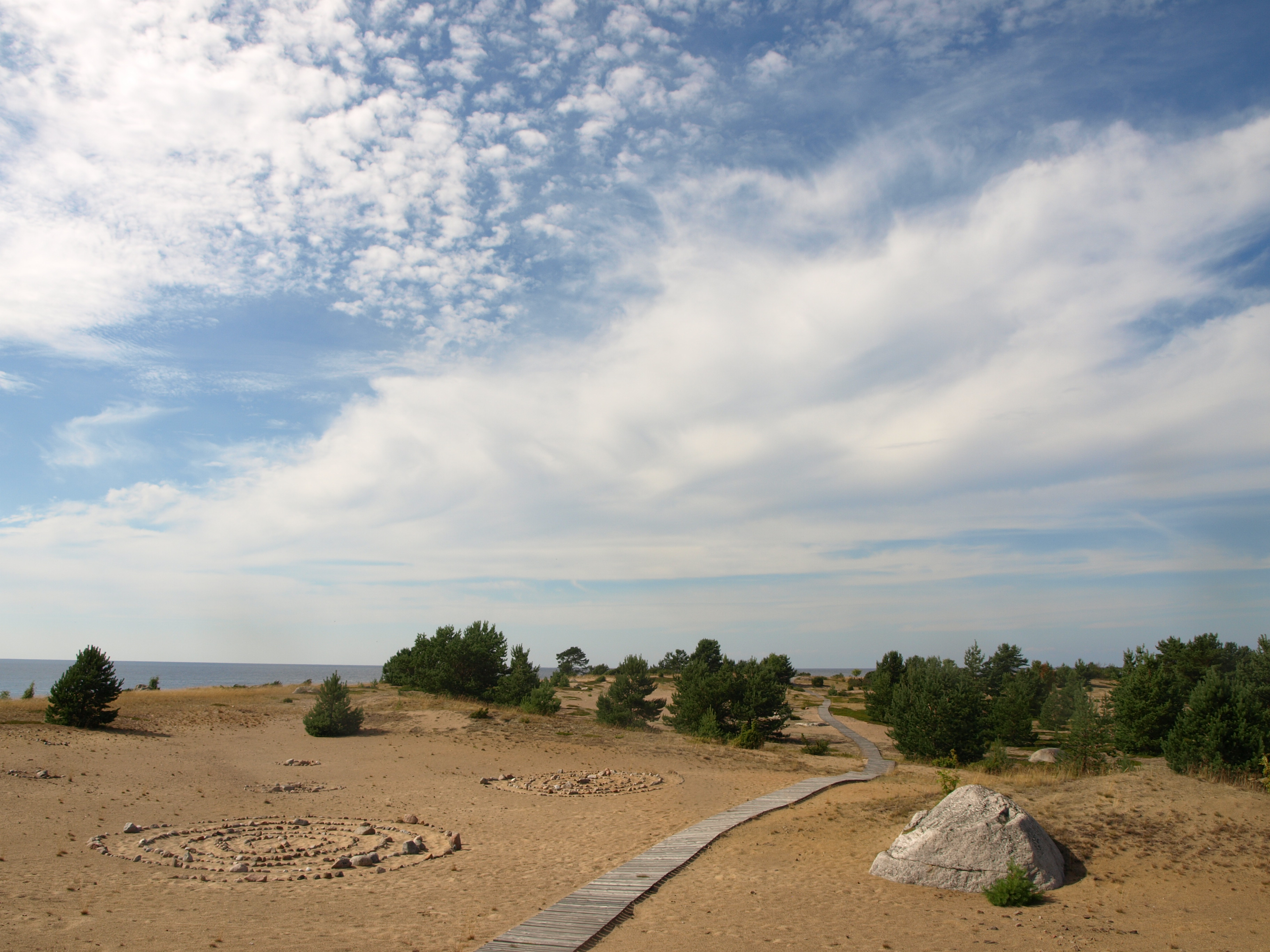

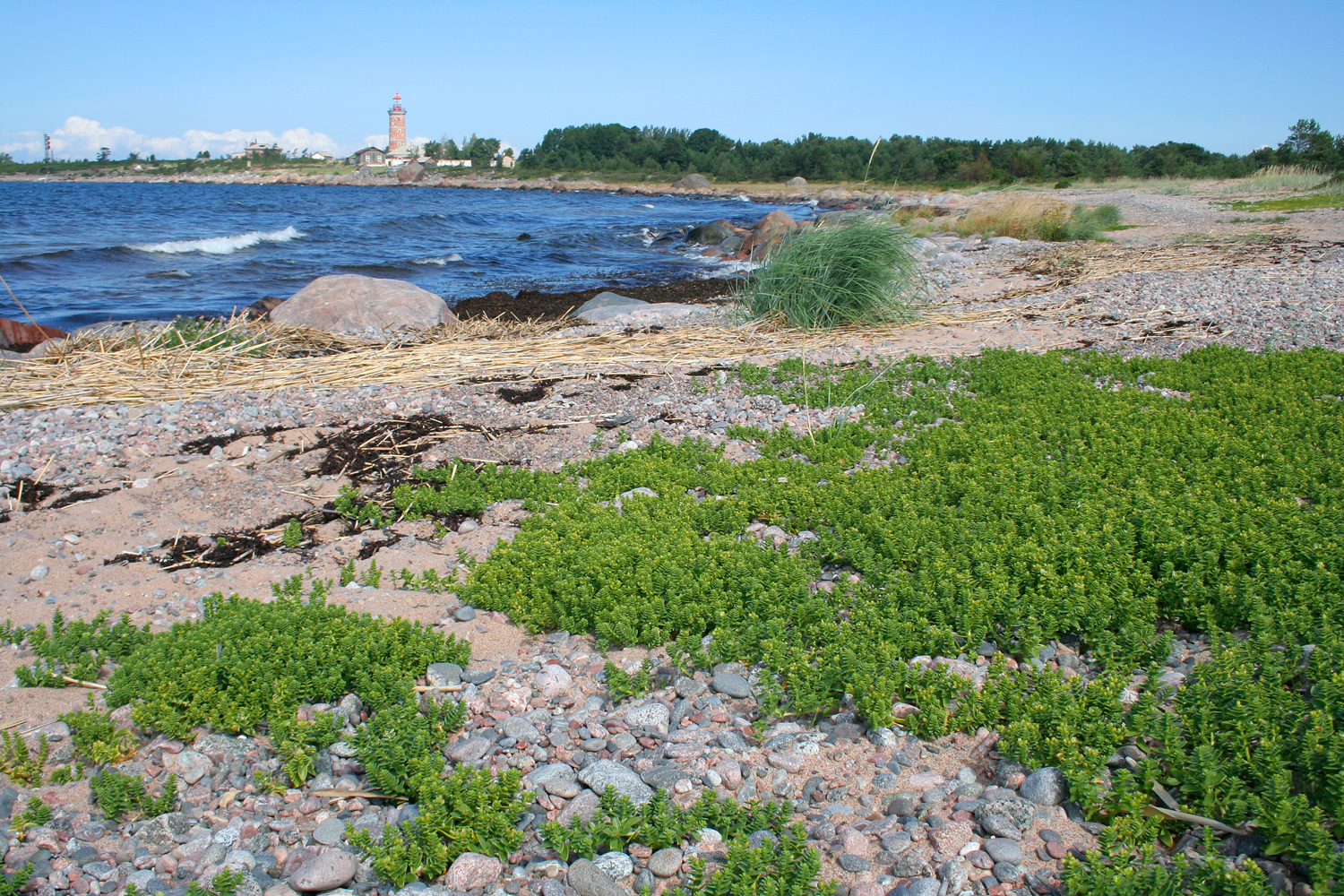

== See also ==
- List of islands of Estonia
