= Pühalepa Parish =

Former municipality of Estonia

Coordinates: 58°52′N 22°57′E

Pühalepa Parish Pühalepa vald
- Former municipality of Estonia
- Coat of arms

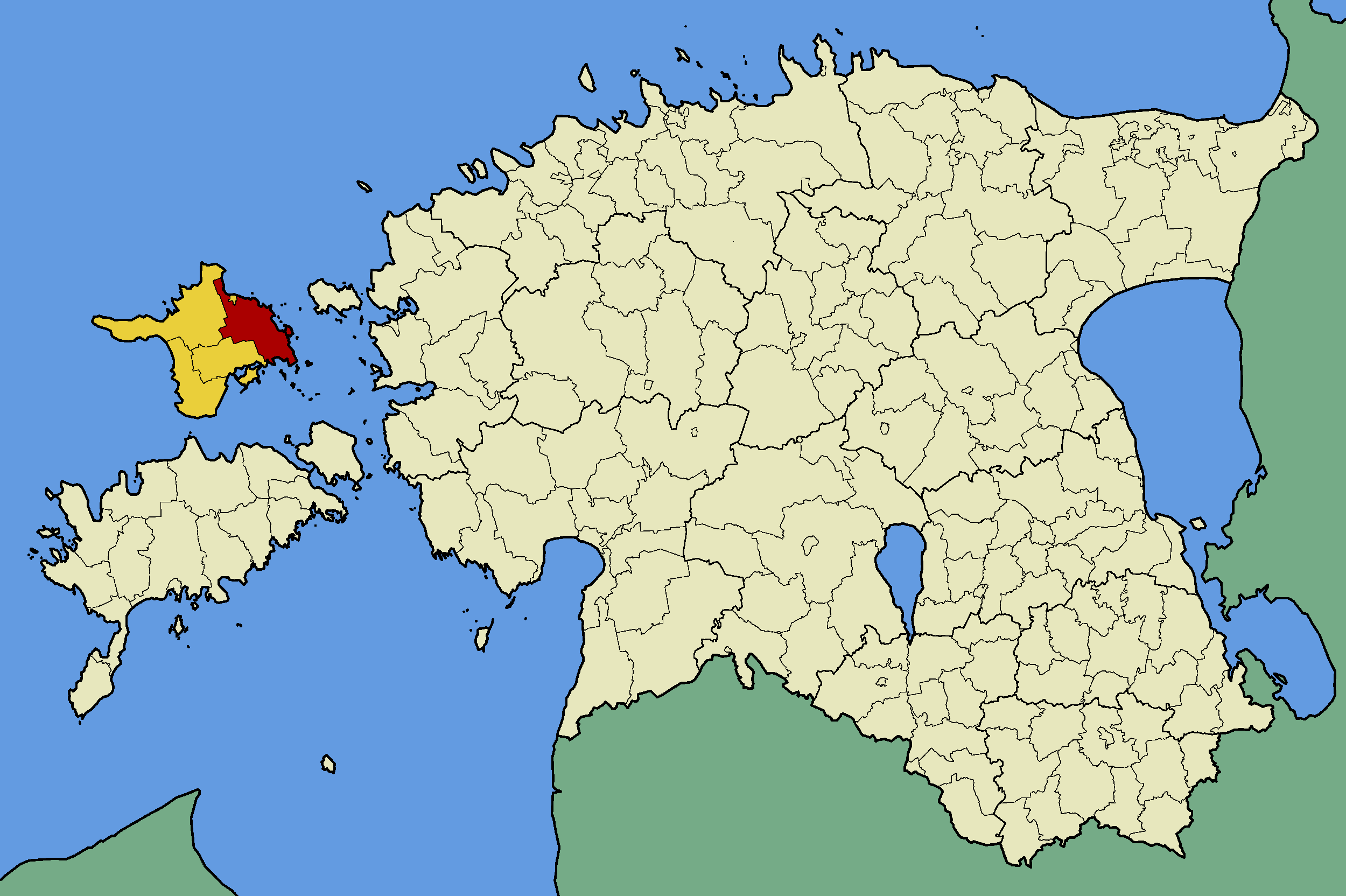
- Pühalepa Parish within Hiiu County.
- Country: Estonia
- County: Hiiu County
- Administrative centre: Tempa

Area
  - Total: 255 km^{2} (98 sq mi)

Population (01.01.2007)
  - Total: 1,711
  - Density: 6.71/km^{2} (17.4/sq mi)
- Website: www.pyhalepa.hiiumaa.ee

Pühalepa Parish was a rural municipality of Hiiu County, Estonia.

== Villages ==
There were 47 villages in Pühalepa Parish: Ala - Aruküla - Hagaste - Harju - Hausma - Hellamaa - Heltermaa - Hiiessaare - Hilleste - Kalgi - Kerema - Kõlunõmme - Kukka - Kuri - Leerimetsa - Linnumäe - Lõbembe - Loja - Lõpe - Määvli - Nõmba - Nõmme - Palade - Paluküla - Partsi - Pilpaküla - Prählamäe - Pühalepa - Puliste - Reikama - Sääre - Sakla - Salinõmme - Sarve - Soonlepa - Suuremõisa - Suuresadama - Tammela - Tareste - Tempa - Tubala - Undama - Vahtrepa - Valipe - Värssu - Viilupi - Vilivalla
