= Uuemaarahu =

Island in Estonia

Coordinates: 58.9386°N 22.9856°E

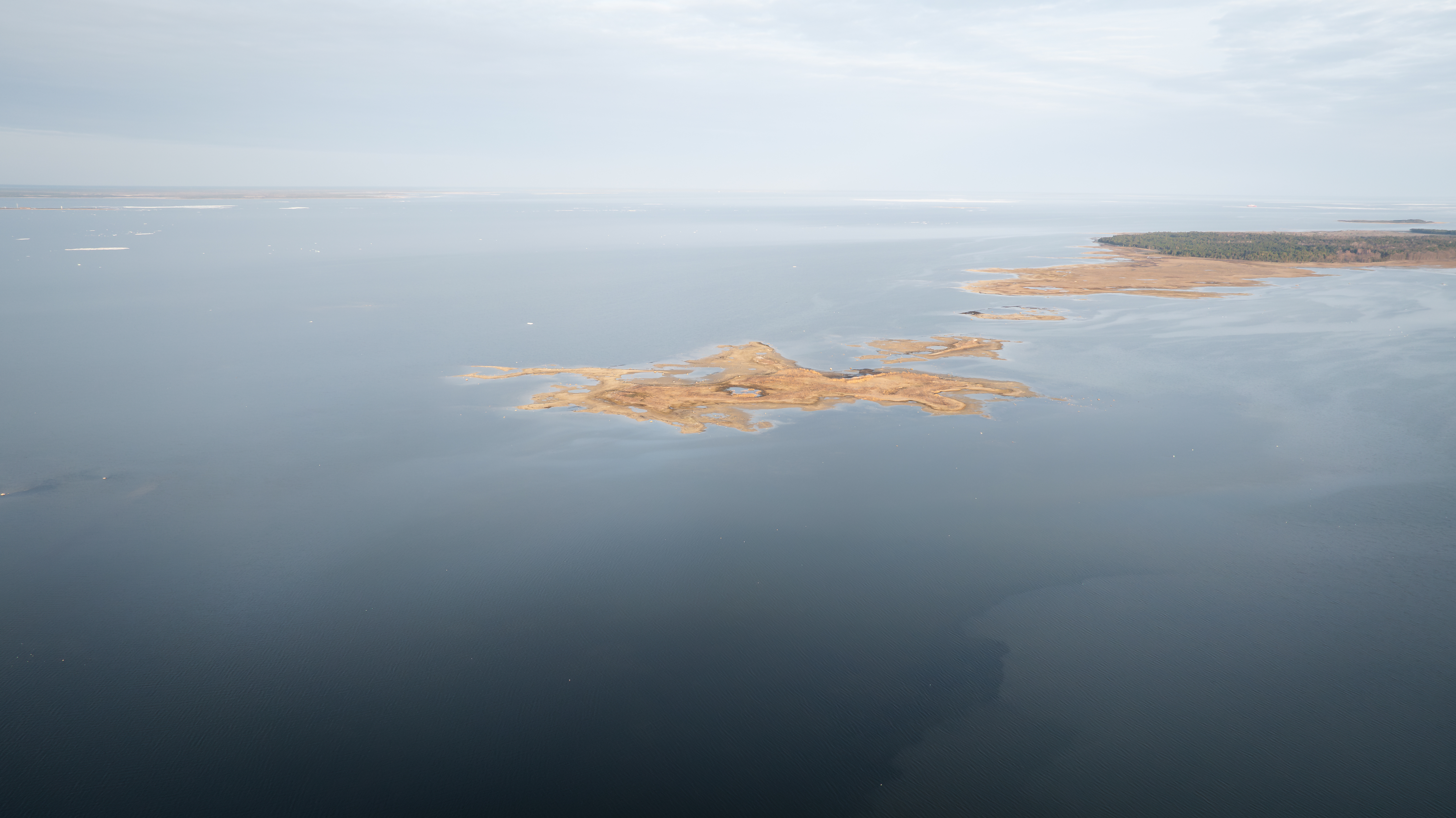
Uuemaarahu

Uuemaarahu is a small, Baltic Sea islet comprising 0.0234 hectares belonging to the country of Estonia.

Uuemaarahu lies 1 kilometer to the southeast of the island of Hellamaa in the Väinameri Strait. It belongs to the administrative municipality of Pühalepa Parish, Hiiu County (Estonian: Hiiu maakond) and is part of the Hiiumaa Islet Landscape Reserve. Other islands nearby include Uuemererahu, Kadakalaid, Ramsi, Hõralaid and Vohilaid.

The islet is an important moulting area for an abundant variety of birds such as: the mute swan, the great black-backed gull, the common gull, the oystercatcher, the Arctic tern, the common eider, the greylag goose, the common goldeneye, the mallard, the goosander, the ruff, the black-tailed godwit, and the barnacle goose.

== See also ==
- List of islands of Estonia

== Furthure reading ==
- Eelis. Keskkonnainfo. Infoleht
