= Kaevatsi =

Island in Estonia

Coordinates: 58°49′05″N 23°04′20″E

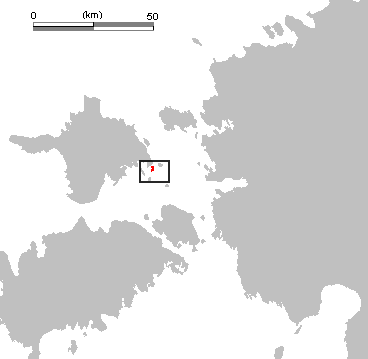
Map showing the location of Kaevatsi

Kaevatsi (also, Kaevatsi laid) is an uninhabited island belonging to the country of Estonia.

Kaevatsi is located in the Väinameri strait, Hiiumaa Parish, 0.4 km southeast of the Sarve peninsula, and is administratively, part of the village of Sarve. Prior to the 2017 administrative reform of Estonian municipalities, it was part of Pühalepa Parish. Kaevatsi is 2.6 km long and 720 meters wide at the northernmost point. It has an total area of 1.4 square kilometers. The northern part of the island rises up to 7.7 meters above sea level. Kaevatsi is part of the Väinameri Conservation Area.

Kaevatsi is covered in juniper stands and is cultivated and used as pasture land, though there are no permanent residents.

Kaevatsi was first mentioned in print in 1564 and 1567 under the Swedish name Swinholm, and consisting of two farms. In 1577, it was mentioned in print as Kaiatze. In 1970, the island had 7 inhabitants, but by 1974, the island was empty of permanent residents. The buildings on Kaevatsi are still well preserved.

== See also ==
List of islands of Estonia
