= Uuemererahu =

Island in Estonia

Coordinates: 58.9828°N 22.9906°E

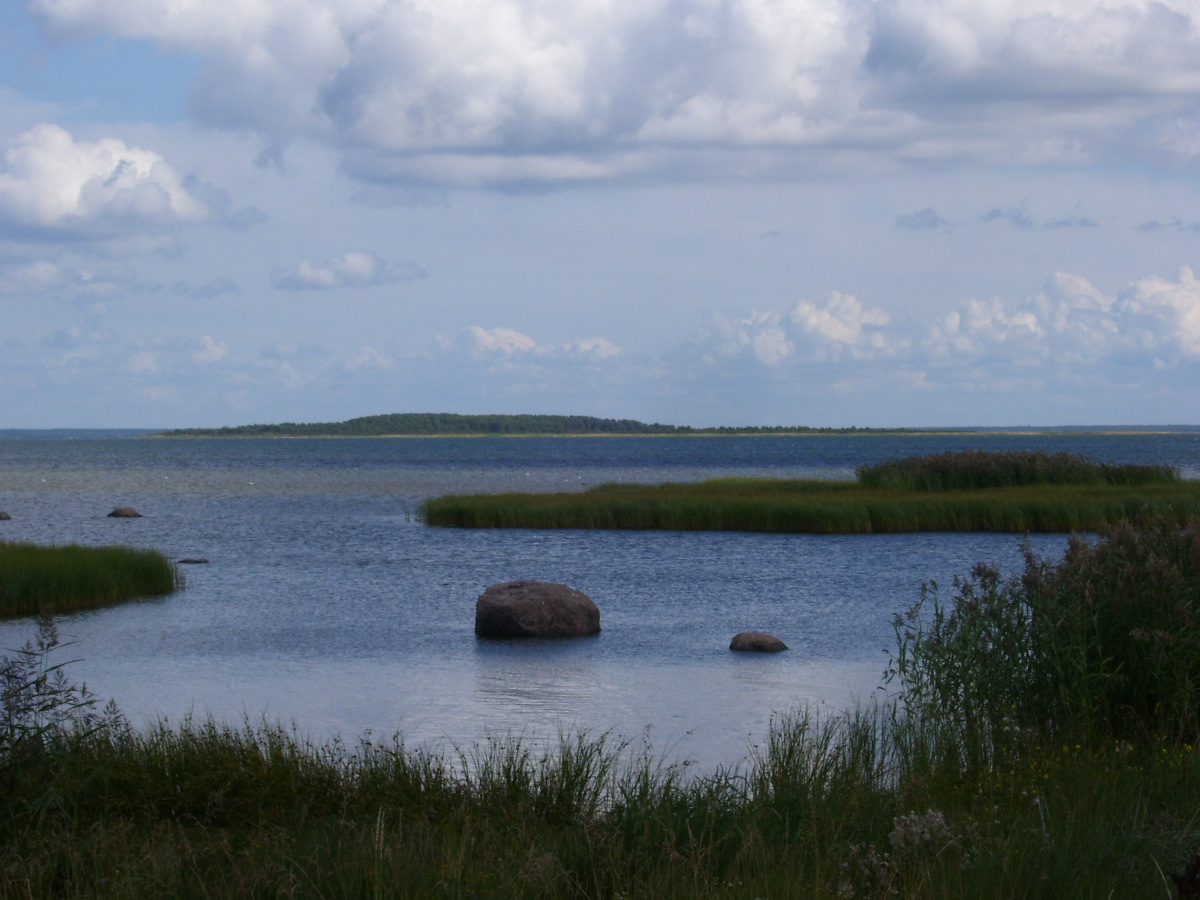
View of Kadakalaid and Uuemerahu from Sääre nose

Uuemererahu is a small Baltic Sea islet comprising 2.3 hectares in area, belonging to the country of Estonia.

Uuemererahu belongs to the administrative municipality of Hiiumaa Parish, Hiiu County (Estonian: Hiiu maakond) and lies approximately 3 km (1.9 mi) east of the island of Hiiumaa and 1 km (0.62 mi) west of the islet of Kadakalaid. Other small islands close by include Uuemaarahu, Hõralaid, Vohilaid, Hellamaa, and Ramsi.

== See also ==
- List of islands of Estonia
