= Kadakalaid =

Island in Estonia

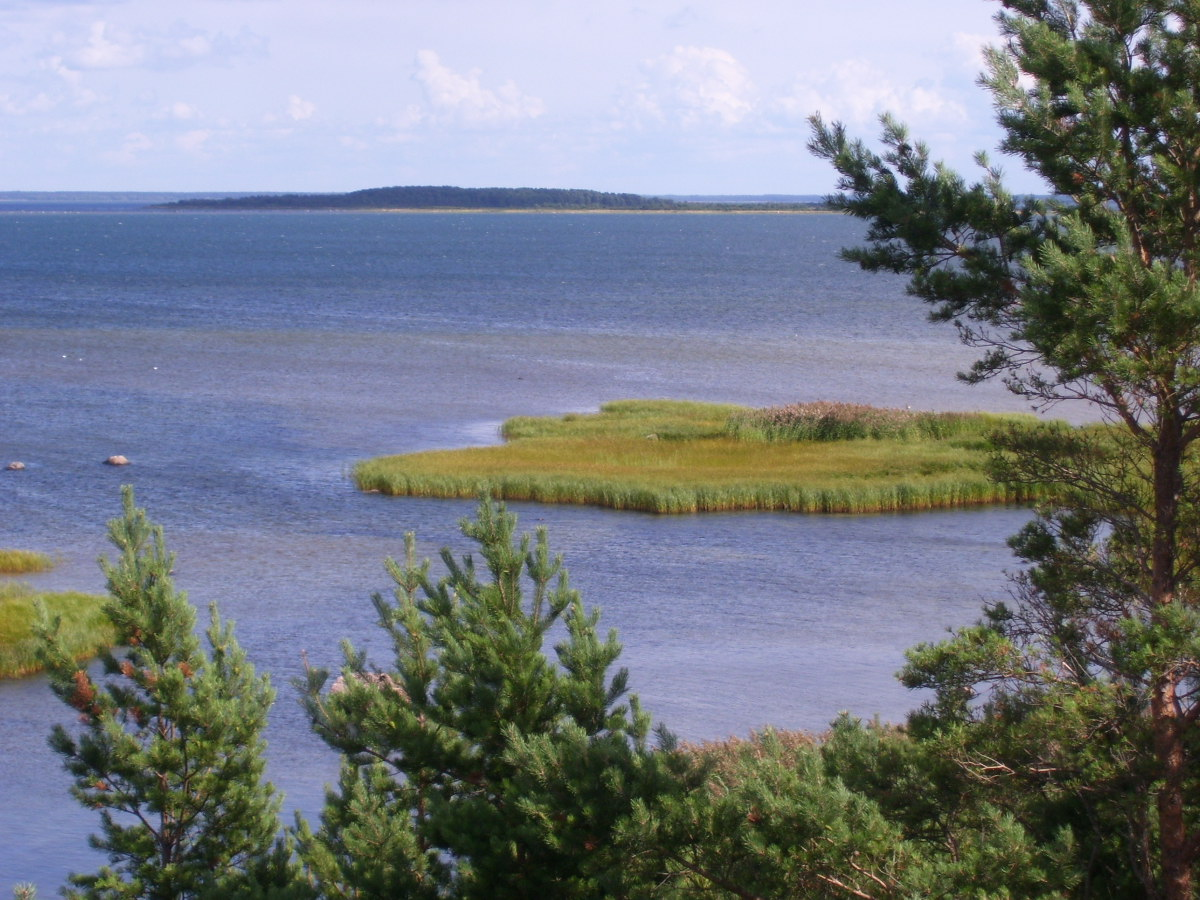
View of Kadakalai from the old watchtower of Sääre's nose

Kadakalaid (Swedish: Oxholm) is a small island in the Baltic Sea belonging to the country of Estonia. Its coordinates are 58°58′55″N 23°00′39″E

Kadakalaid lies just northeast of the island of Hiiumaa and belongs to the administrative municipality of Pühalepa Parish, Hiiu County (Estonian: Hiiu maakond). Other small islands close by include: Veskirahu, Männaklaid, Hõralaid, Vohilaid, Hellamaa, Uuemererahu, Uuemaarahu and Ramsi.

== See also ==
- List of islands of Estonia
