= Sakla =

Sakla may refer to:

== Geography ==
Places in Estonia:

- Sakla, Hiiu County, village in Pühalepa Parish, Hiiu County
- Sakla, Saare County, village in Valjala Parish, Saare County

== Religion ==
- Saklas or Sakla, another name for Yaldabaoth, the demiurge in Gnosticism
