= William von Wirén =

Estonian sailor

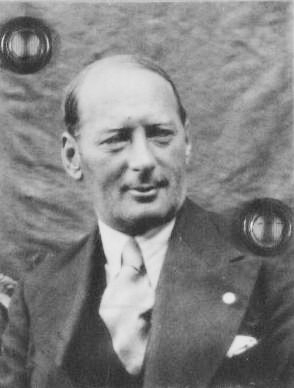

Personal information
- Born: 11 September [O.S. 29 August] 1894 Suuresadama, Kreis Wiek, Governorate of Estonia, Russian Empire
- Died: 23 November 1956 (aged 62) Stockholm, Sweden
Medal record
Sailing
Representing Estonia
Olympic Games
Bronze medal – third place	1928 Amsterdam	6 metre class

William von Wirén (11 September [O.S. 29 August] 1894 in Suuresadama, Hiiumaa – 23 November 1956 in Stockholm) was an Estonian sailor who competed in the 1928 Summer Olympics.

In 1928, he was a crew member of the Estonian boat Tutti V, which won the bronze medal in the 6 metre class.

He also won a gold medal in European Championships in ice yachting in 20 m class in 1933 and 1934 and a bronze medal in International Monotype-XV ice yacht class in 1936.
