= Hari Strait =

Strait in Estonia

Coordinates: 58°57′42″N 23°03′59″E

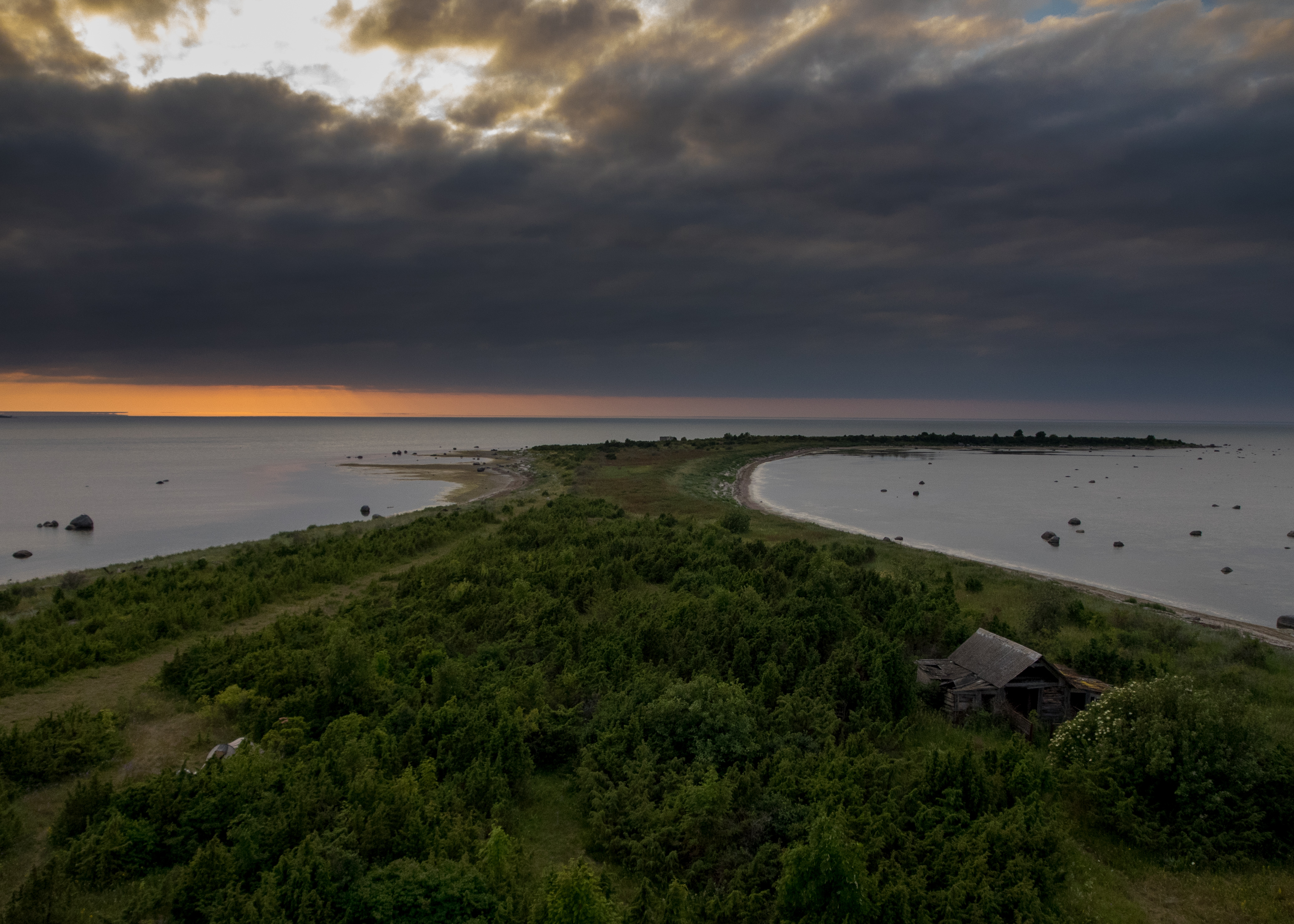
Hari Strait

The Hari Strait (Estonian: Hari kurk) is a strait in Estonia, located between Hiiumaa and Vormsi; this strait is part of Väinameri.

The strait's width is 10 to 13 km, and its depth mostly some meters.

Several islets are located in the strait, including Hellamaa rahu and Kadakalaid.
