= Moonsund Regatta =

Sailing competition in Estonia

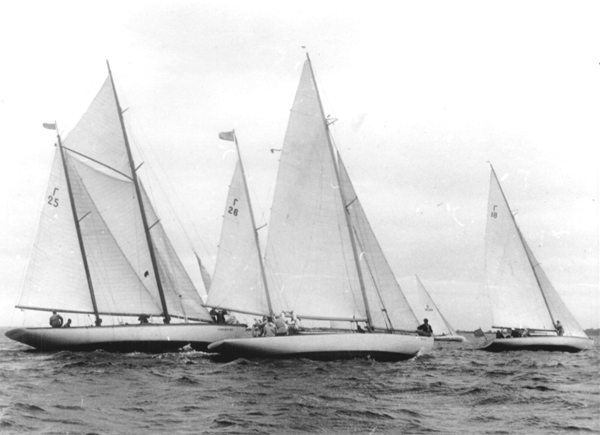
Moonsund Regatta in 1958

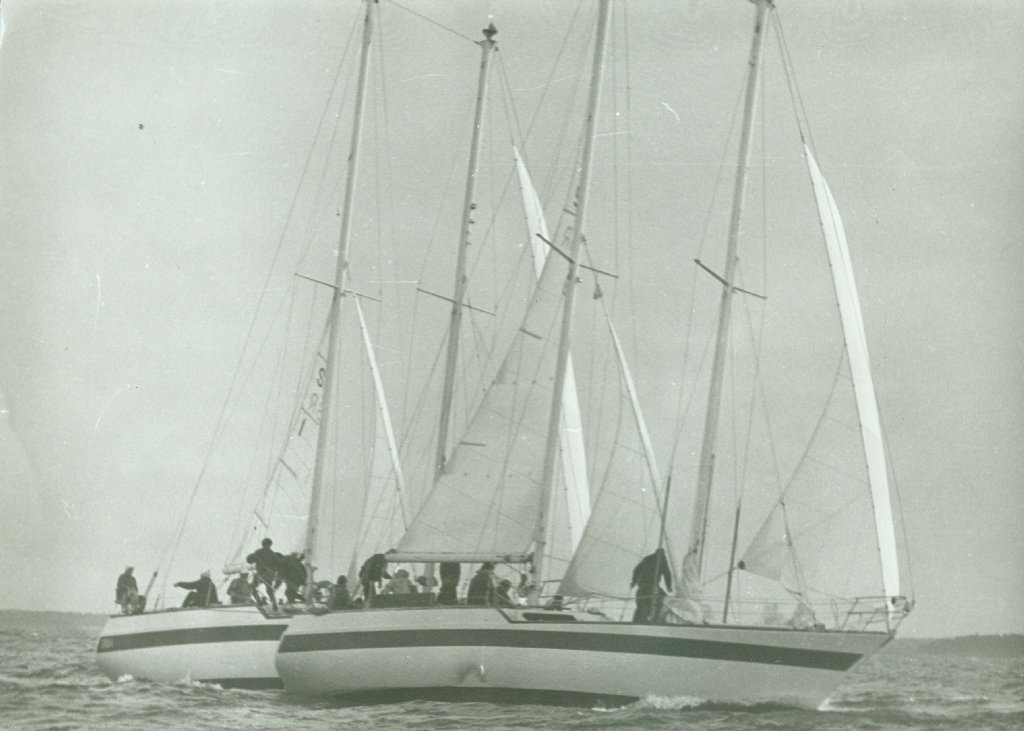
Moonsund Regatta in 1983. Boats EDDA and MINNA

Moonsund Regatta (Estonian: Muhu väina regatt) is a sailing competition that takes place on Väinameri (Moonsund) in Estonia.

First Regatta took place in 1958.

In 2017, there was 60. Regatta, and this Regatta was the biggest of Moonsund Regattas: 850 sailors with 144 yachts, and sailors from five countries (Estonia, Latvia, Lithuania, Finland and Russia).

== In popular culture ==
films

- 1974 – Moonsund Regatta, 15 minutes in ETV
- 1994 – 38. Moonsund Regatta, in RTV and Lucky Strike
- 1996 – Moonsund Regatta, 40 minutes, directed by Jaanus Nõgisto
