= Paluküla, Hiiu County =

Paluküla
- Village
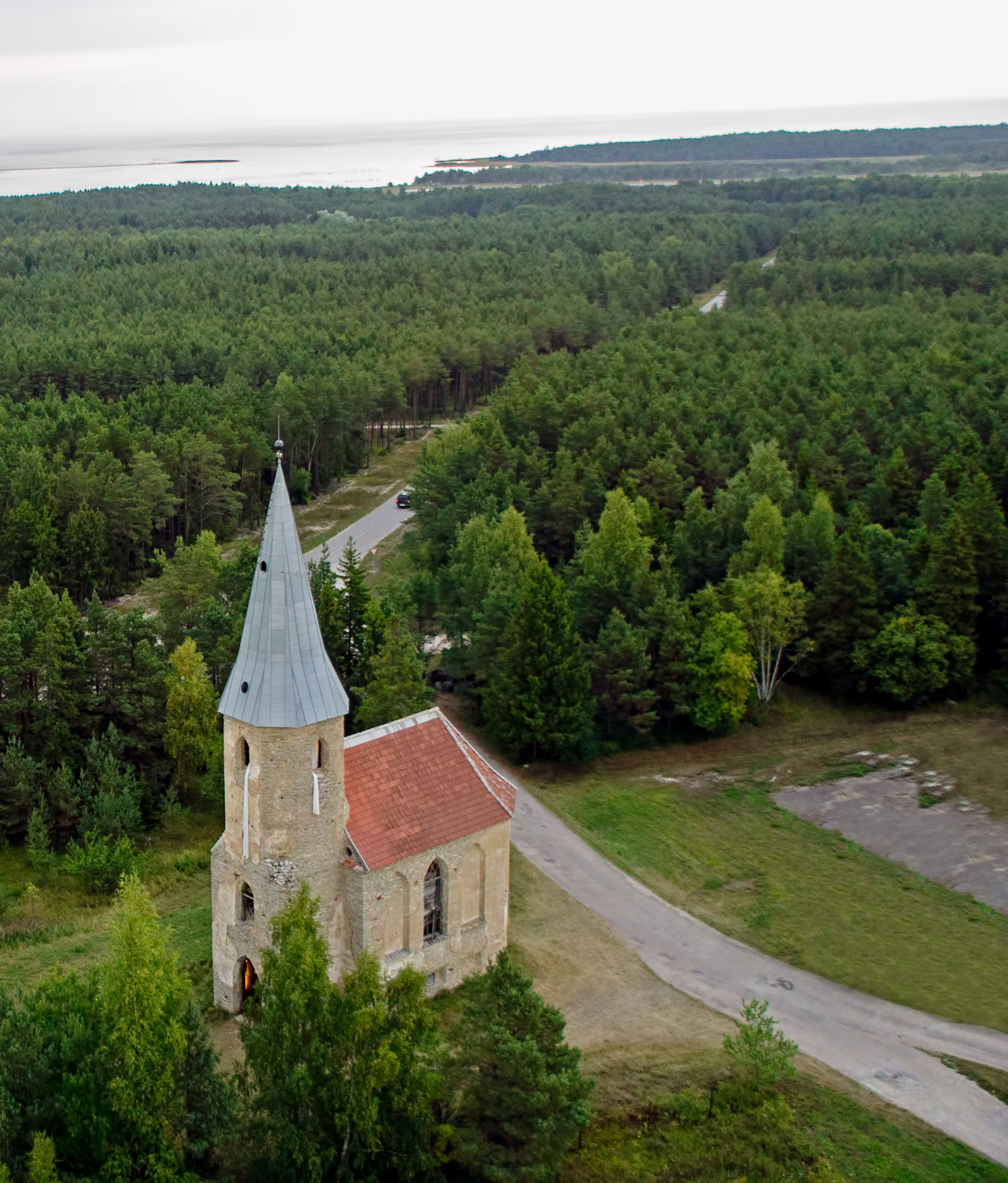
- Paluküla Church

- Location within Estonia
- Coordinates: 58°58′45″N 22°48′38″E
- Country: Estonia
- County: Hiiu County
- Parish: Hiiumaa Parish
- Time zone: UTC+2 (EET)
  - Summer (DST): UTC+3 (EEST)

Paluküla is a village in Hiiumaa Parish, Hiiu County in northwestern Estonia. The population of the village was 78, all of whom are Estonians.
