= Hagaste =

Village in Estonia

- Village
- Location within Estonia
- Coordinates: 58°55′13″N 22°57′36″E
- Country: Estonia
- County: Hiiu County
- Parish: Hiiumaa Parish
- Time zone: UTC+2 (EET)
  - Summer (DST): UTC+3 (EEST)

Hagaste is a village in Hiiumaa Parish, Hiiu County in northwestern Estonia.

The village was first mentioned in 1620 (by Akaste). Historically, the village was part of Suuremõisa Manor (German: Grossenhof).

The eastern part of the village is known as Sillaotsa, Süllatse, or Silluste. From 1977 to 1997, Hagaste was part of the village of Värssu.
