= Ala, Hiiu County =

Village in Estonia

Ala
- Village
- Location within Estonia
- Coordinates: 58°57′18″N 22°49′33″E
- Country: Estonia
- County: Hiiu County
- Parish: Hiiumaa Parish
- Time zone: UTC+2 (EET)
  - Summer (DST): UTC+3 (EEST)

Ala is a village in Hiiumaa Parish, Hiiu County in northwestern Estonia.

The village was first mentioned in 1798 (Alla).

From 1977 to 1997 the village was part of Palade. From 1997 to 1998 the village bore the name Alaküla.
