= Tempa, Estonia =

Village in Estonia

Tempa
- Village
- Location within Estonia
- Coordinates: 58°56′N 22°55′E
- Country: Estonia
- County: Hiiu County
- Parish: Hiiumaa Parish
- Time zone: UTC+2 (EET)
  - Summer (DST): UTC+3 (EEST)

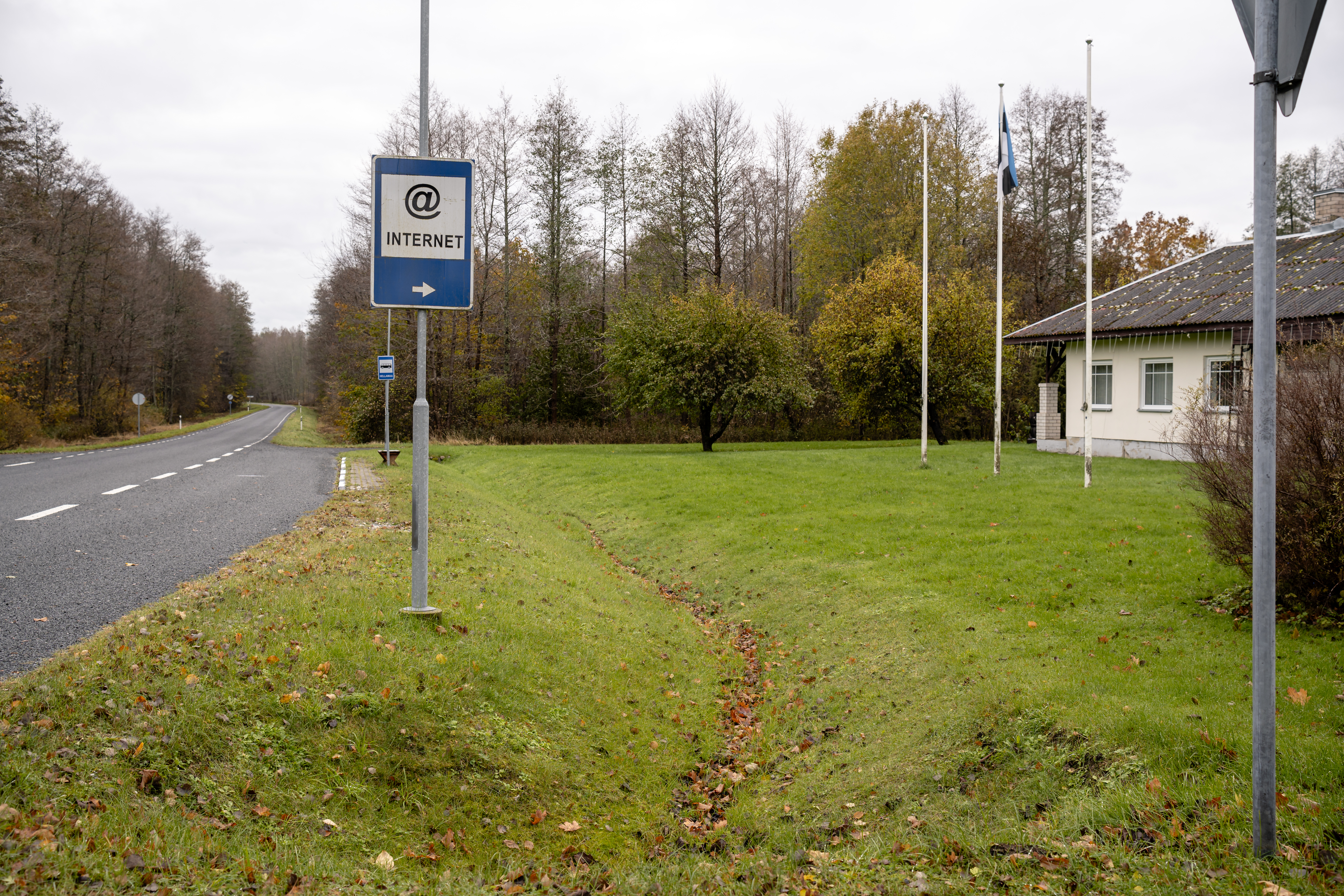
Hellamaa Library

Tempa is a village in Hiiu County in Estonia. It was the administrative centre of Pühalepa Parish.
