= Väinameri Conservation Area =

Protected area in Estonia

Location of the Väinameri Sea

The Väinameri Conservation Area (Estonian: Väinamere hoiuala) is a protected area in Estonia.

The Väinameri Conservation Area was established in 2007 to protect the Väinameri Conservation Area and the surrounding coastal area. The conservation area consists of the Väinameri Sea and the partial conservation areas of four counties; the Hiiu sub-conservation area, the Lääne County sub-conservation area, the Pärnu County sub-conservation area, and the Saare sub-conservation area. It has also been designated an Important Bird Area (IBA) by BirdLife International.

The conservation area protects, for example, coastal lakes, underwater sand dunes, small islands, islets and coastal meadows, as well as the habitats of many protected species (Cypripedium calceolus, northern shoveler, tundra swan).

== See also ==
- Protected areas of Estonia
