= Suuresadama =

Village in Estonia

- Village
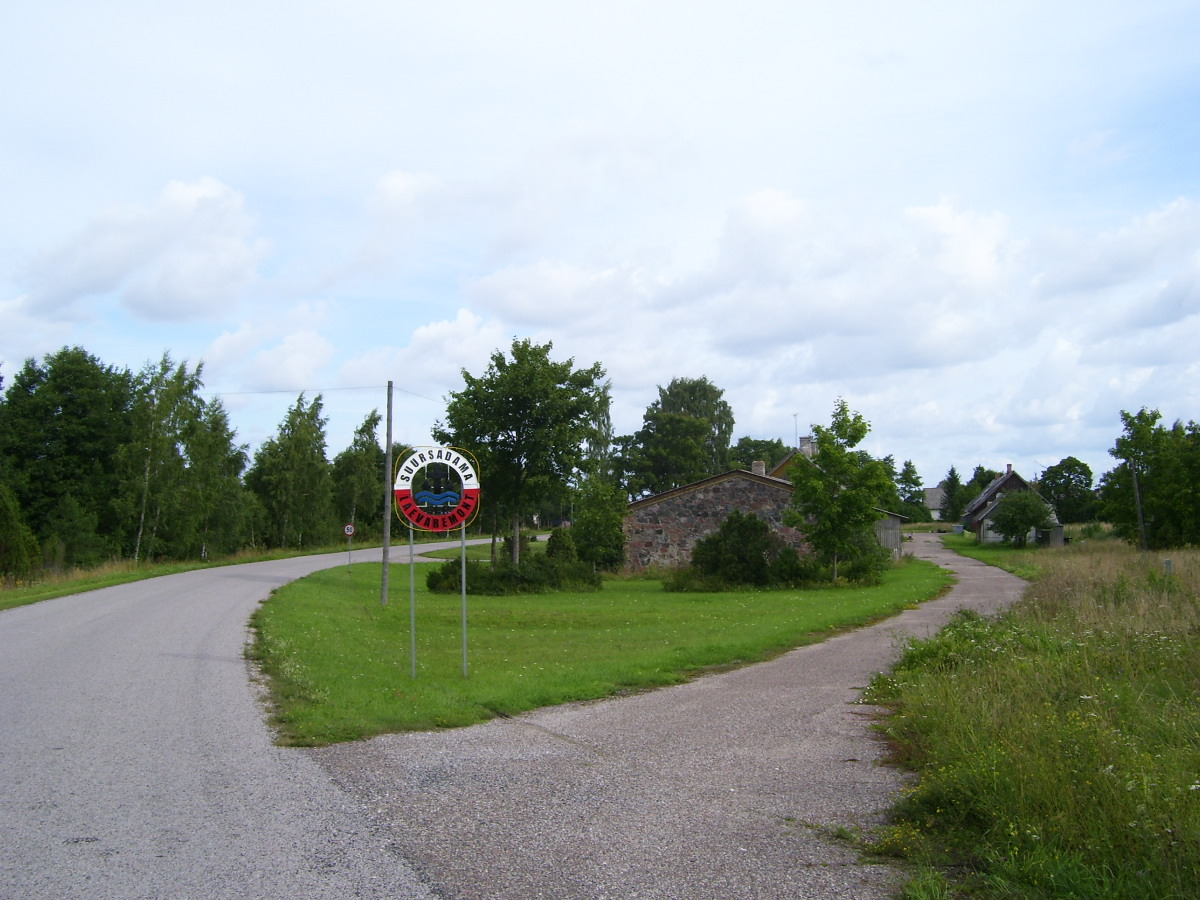

- Location within Estonia
- Coordinates: 58°58′25″N 22°54′23″E
- Country: Estonia
- County: Hiiu County
- Parish: Hiiumaa Parish
- Time zone: UTC+2 (EET)
  - Summer (DST): UTC+3 (EEST)

Suuresadama is a village in Hiiumaa Parish, Hiiu County, in northwestern Estonia.

== Name ==
Suuresadama was attested in historical sources as Tiefhaven in 1782, Saddam in 1782 and 1798, and Tiefenhafen in 1798. The name means 'big harbor', from suur 'big' (genitive suure) plus sadam 'harbor' (genitive sadama), referring to the harbor in the village facing the Hari Strait. The German name Tiefenhafen means 'deep harbor'.
