= Kõlunõmme =

Village in Estonia

- Village
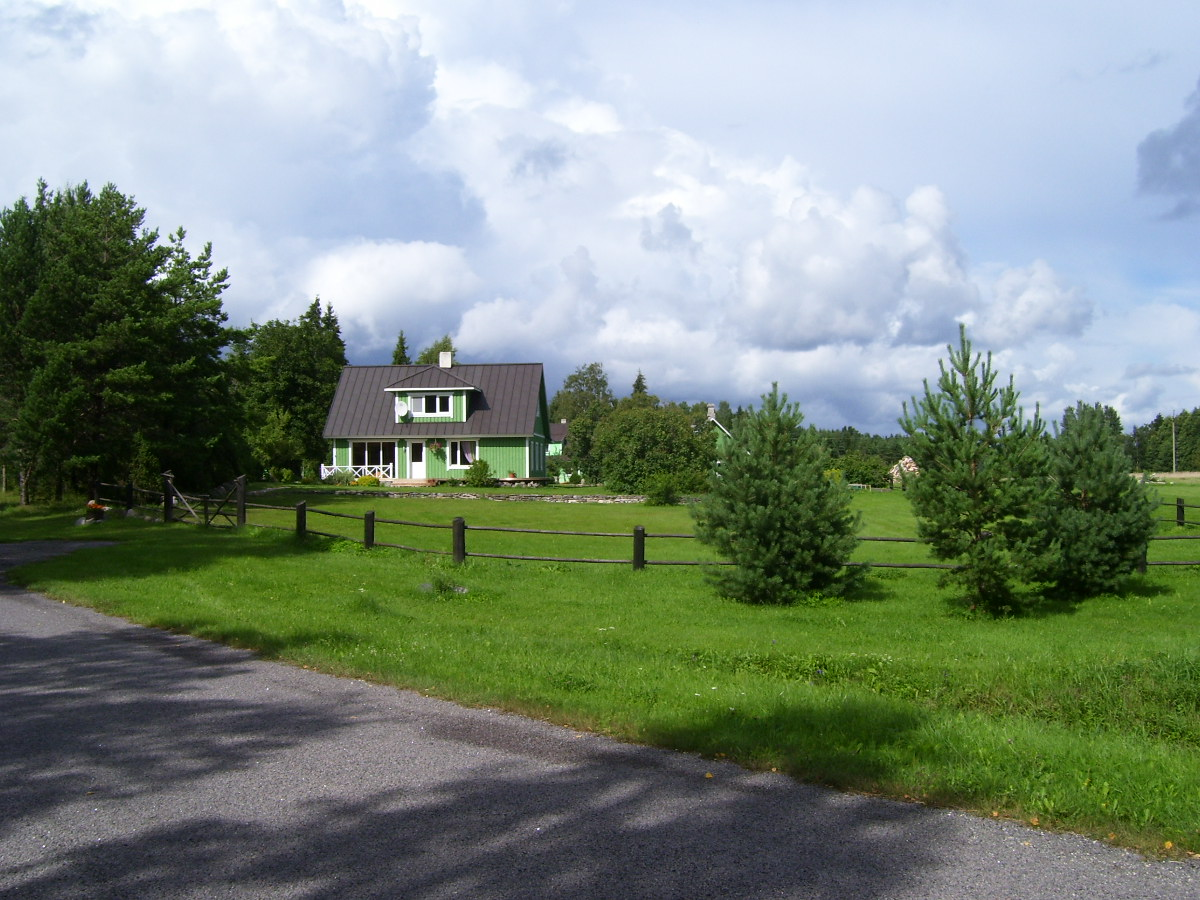
- Farmstead in Kõlunõmme

- Location within Estonia
- Coordinates: 58°58′N 22°53′E
- Country: Estonia
- County: Hiiu County
- Parish: Hiiumaa Parish

Population (2011)
  - Total: 33
- Time zone: UTC+2 (EET)
  - Summer (DST): UTC+3 (EEST)

Kõlunõmme is a village in Hiiumaa Parish, Hiiu County in northwestern Estonia. According to the 2011 Estonia Census, it has a population of 33, with 32 Estonians.

== Gallery ==
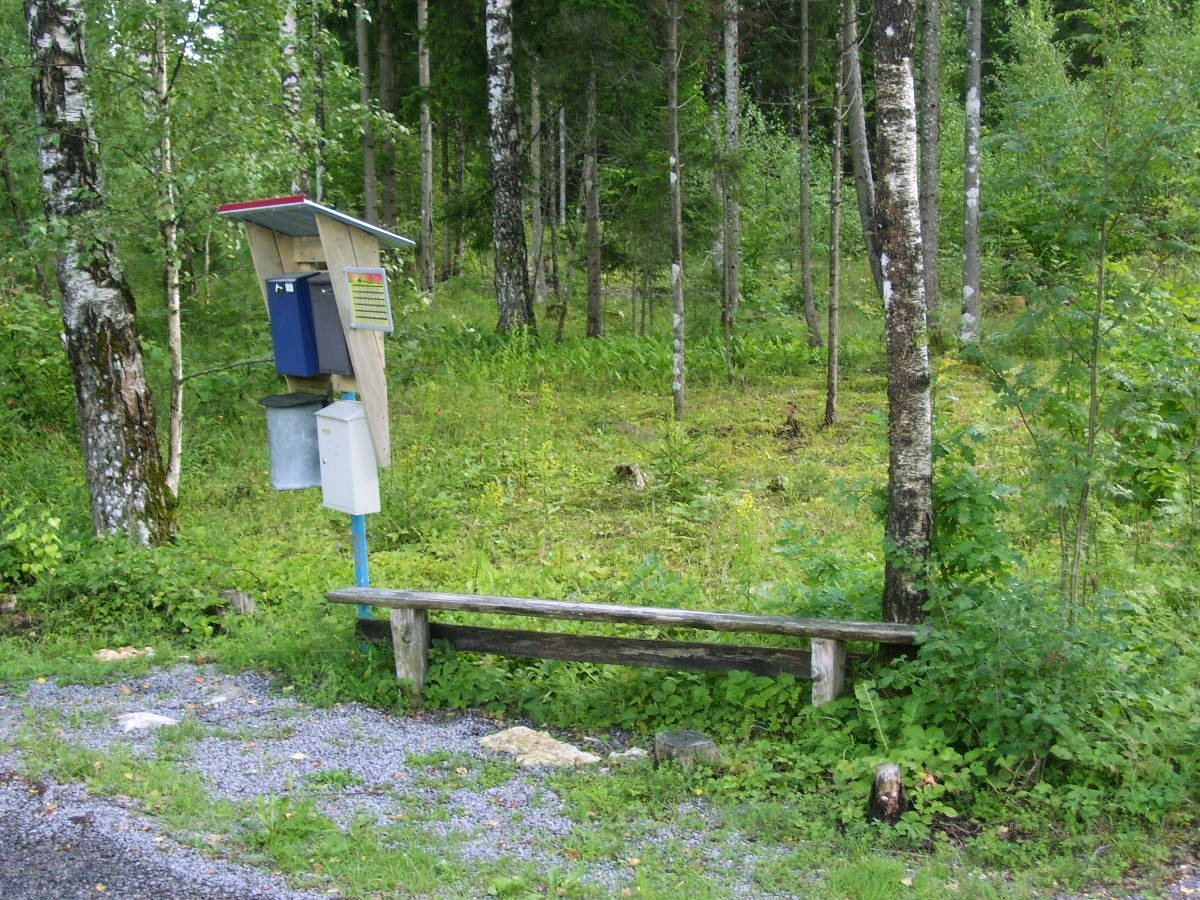
Kõlunõmme village center

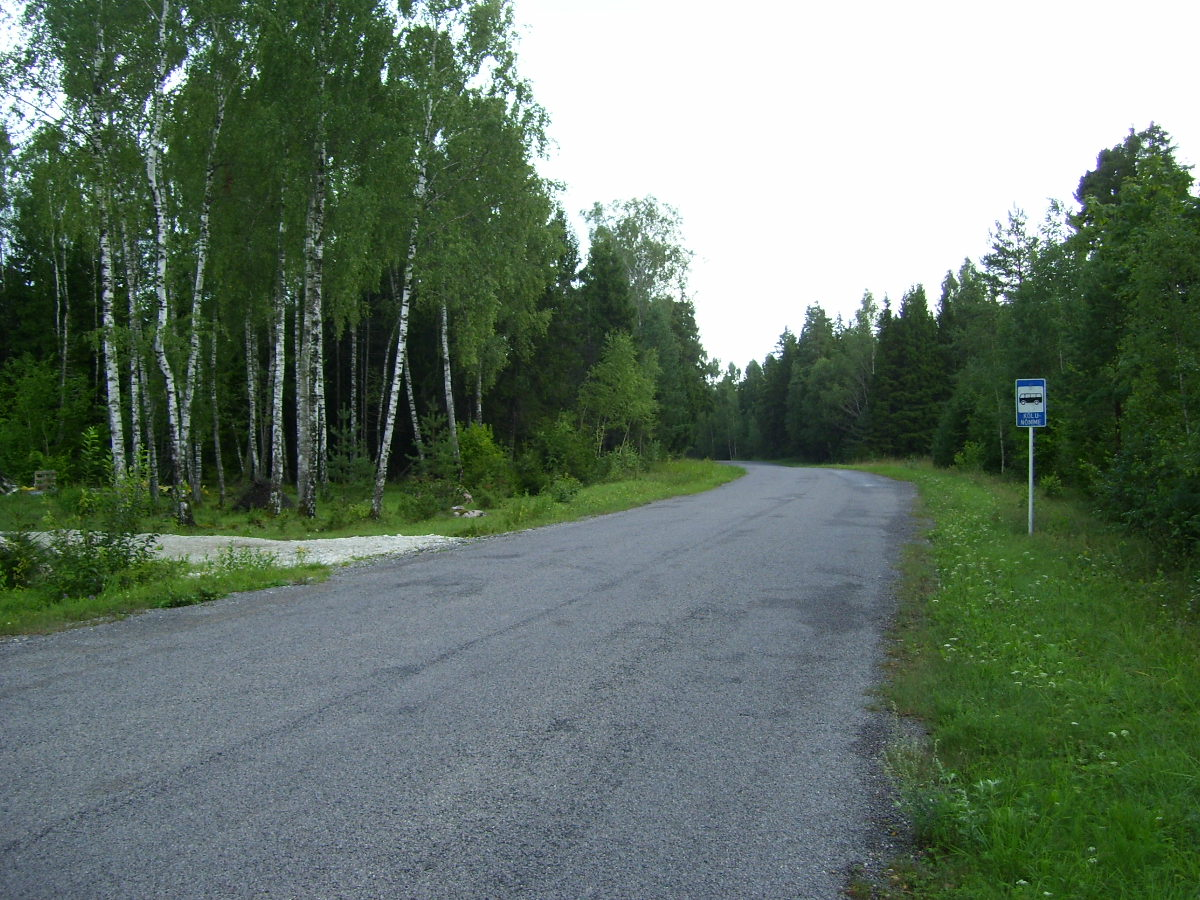
Kõlunõmme bus stop
