= Paluküla Church =

Church building in Estonia

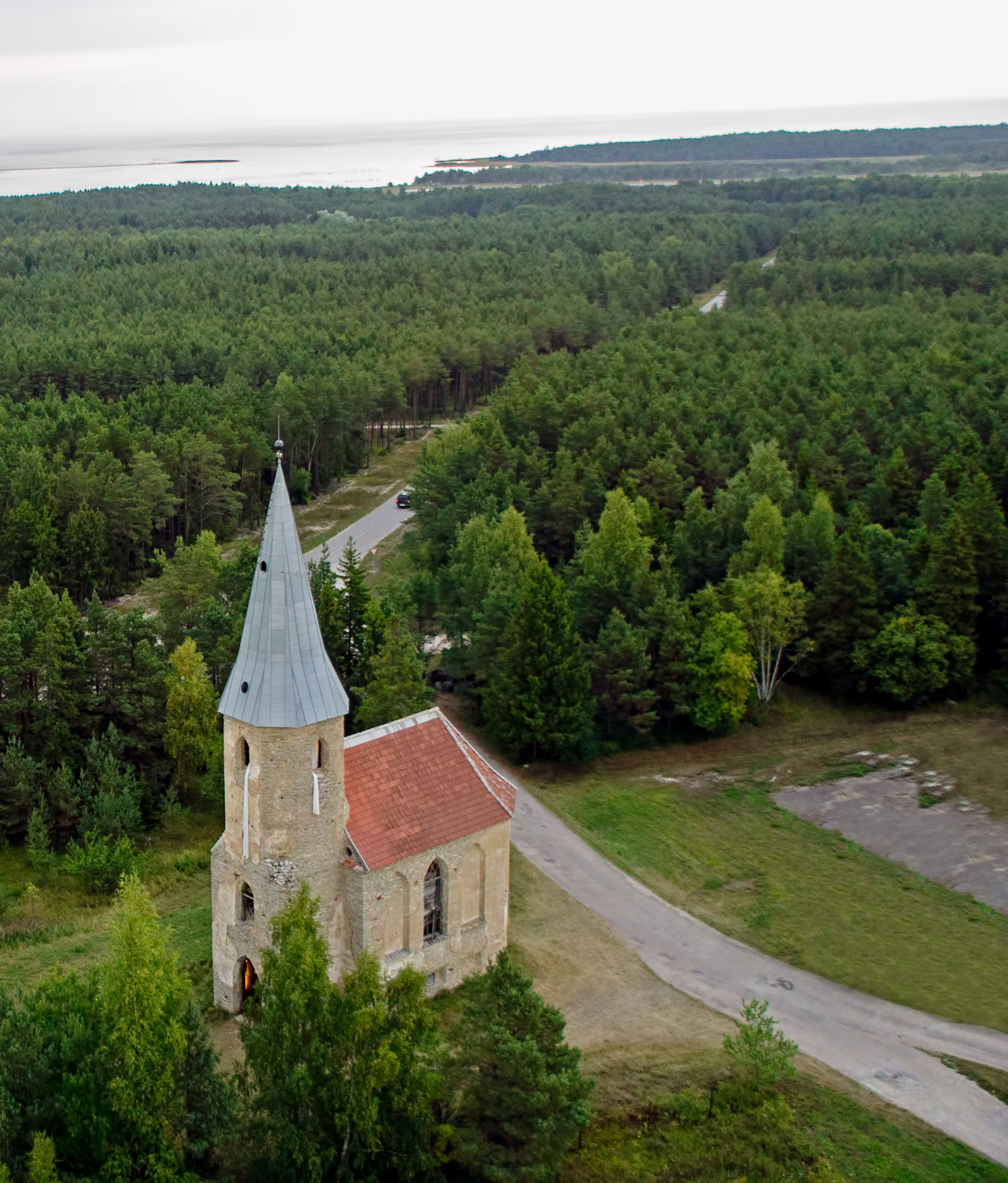
- Aerial view of church

- Location within Estonia
- Paluküla Church
- 58°59′13″N 22°48′18″E
- Location: Hiiu County
- Country: Estonia

Architecture
- Functional status: not active
- Architectural type: Church
- Style: Gothic
- Groundbreaking: 19th century
- Completed: 1820

Specifications
- Capacity: 100

Administration
- Parish: Hiiumaa Parish

Paluküla Church is in Hiiumaa Parish, Hiiu County, Estonia in a woodland close to the road. The church was founded by the baronial family of Ungern-Sternberg in 1820. Until 1939, it was as branch church of the parish church in Kärdla. Paluküla church has been registered in the list of cultural monuments of Estonia since 1999 under number 23605.

== History ==
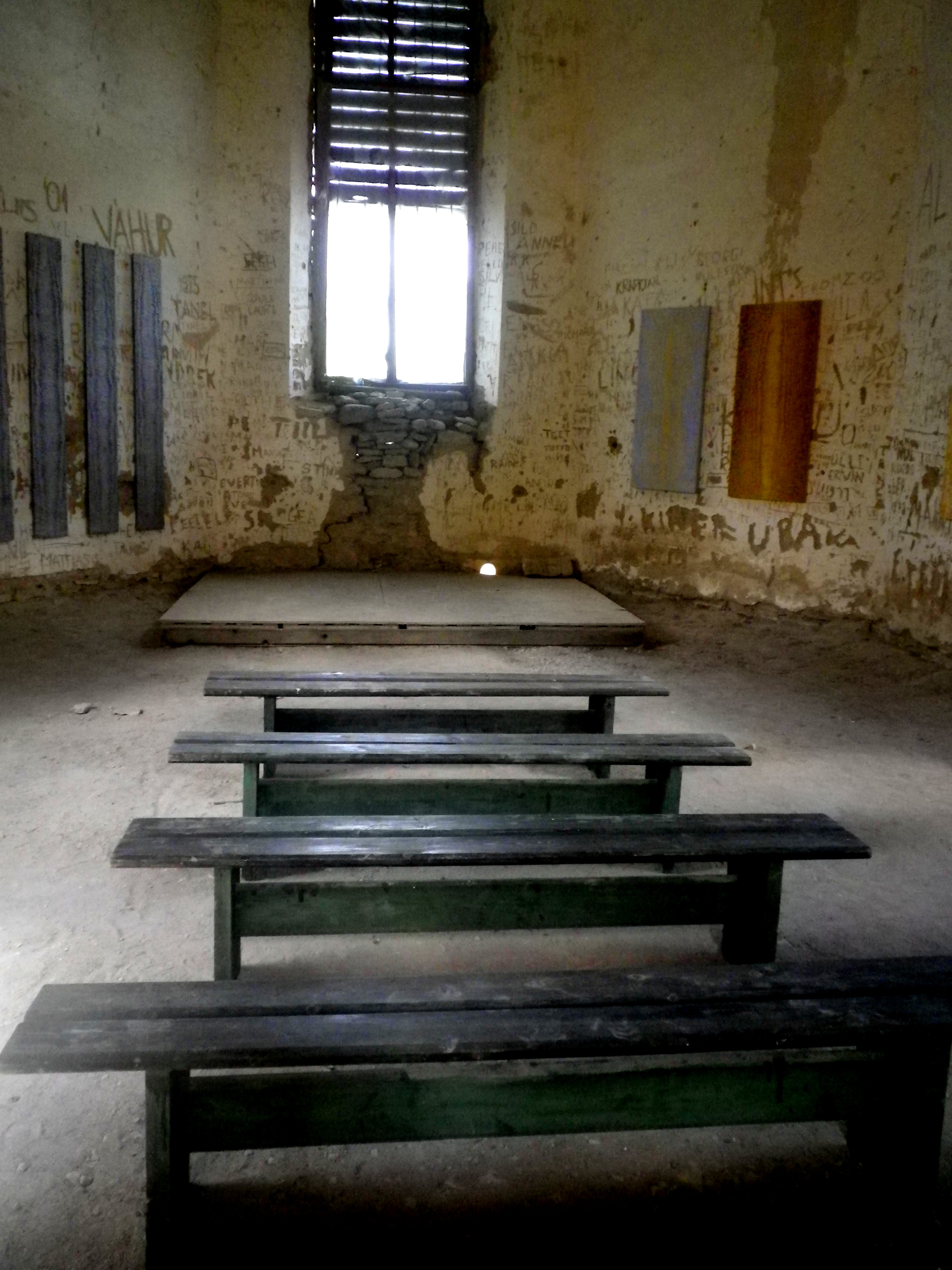
Internal view

There was no pastorate at Paluküla Church, it had 100 seats. The church was built in 1820 for the family of Baron Ungern-Sternberg as a cemetery church, however, due to the high groundwater level, it was not possible to build a burial crypts below ground level, so there is no graveyard near the church. In 1939, after the annexation of Hiiumaa island by the Soviet Union and its transformation into a military zone, the church was used as a warehouse for military equipment. The church tower was used as a lookout position. After the Second World War, the building again served as a warehouse and the tower as an observation post. Over time it was gradually abandoned until, in 1989, the tower was ruined by a fire. The tower was repaired in 1994 and a roof was built in 1996.

== Nautical navigation point ==
The church tower served as a daily nautical navigation point. It was a rear sea mark in range with Hiiessaare Lighthouse. The distance between these points is 2580 meters with a target azimuth of 229.6°. It is listed under the number 626 in the Estonian lighthouse number list.

Location of Hiiessaare lighthouse at 59°0′6″N 22°50′19″E
and Paluküla Church at 58°59′13″N 22°48′18″E
