= Palade =

Village in Estonia

- Village
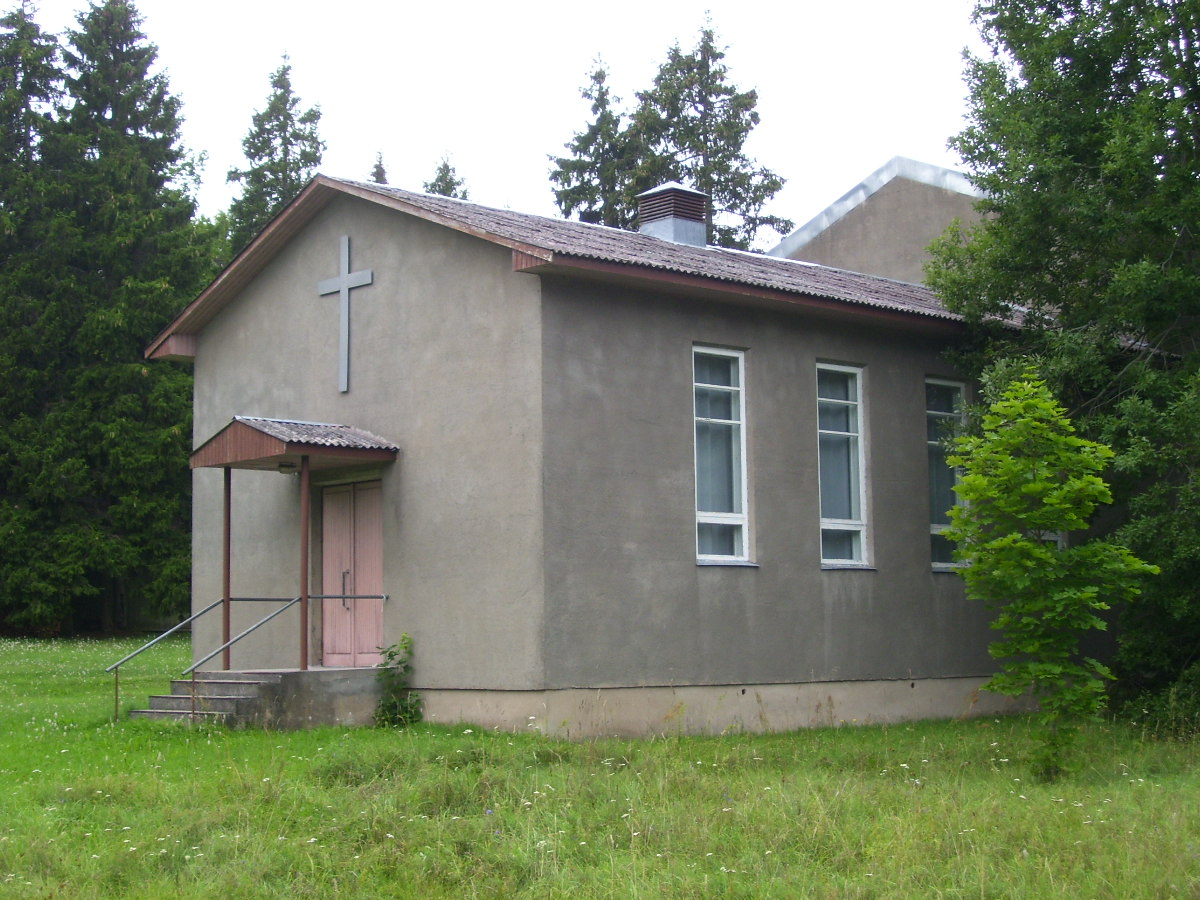
- Chapel in Palade

- Location within Estonia
- Coordinates: 58°58′N 22°51′E
- Country: Estonia
- County: Hiiu County
- Parish: Hiiumaa Parish
- Time zone: UTC+2 (EET)
  - Summer (DST): UTC+3 (EEST)

Palade is a village in Hiiumaa Parish, Hiiu County in northwestern Estonia.

== Gallery ==
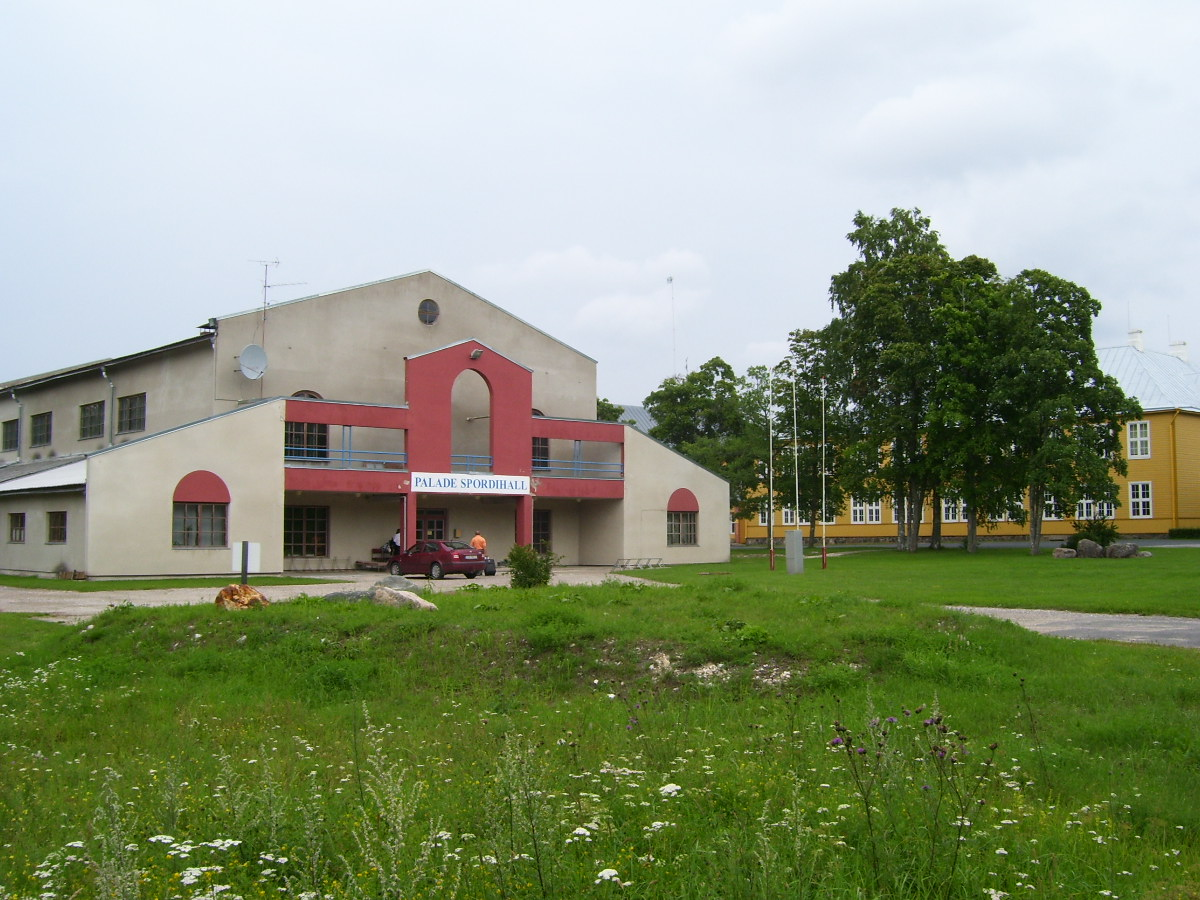
Palade sport hall (school building in the background)

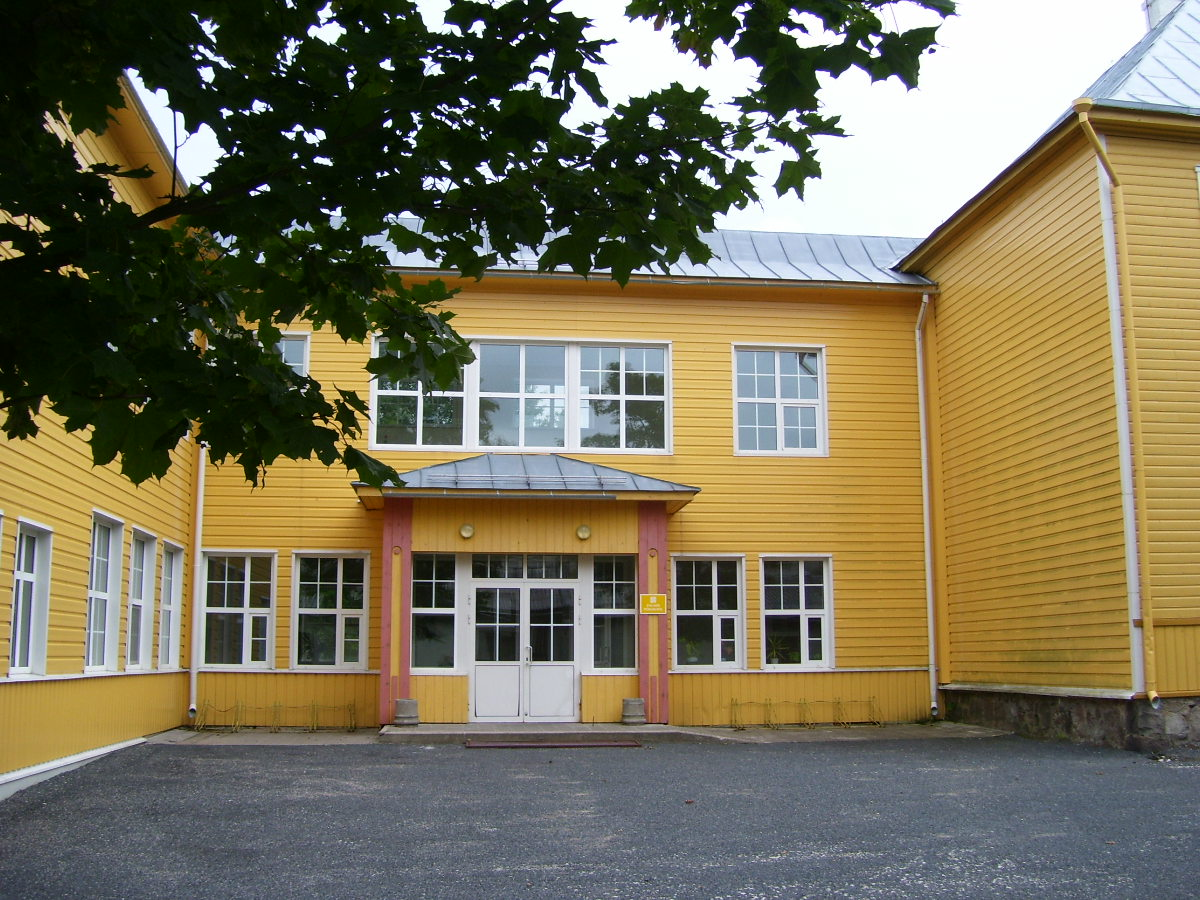
Palade school

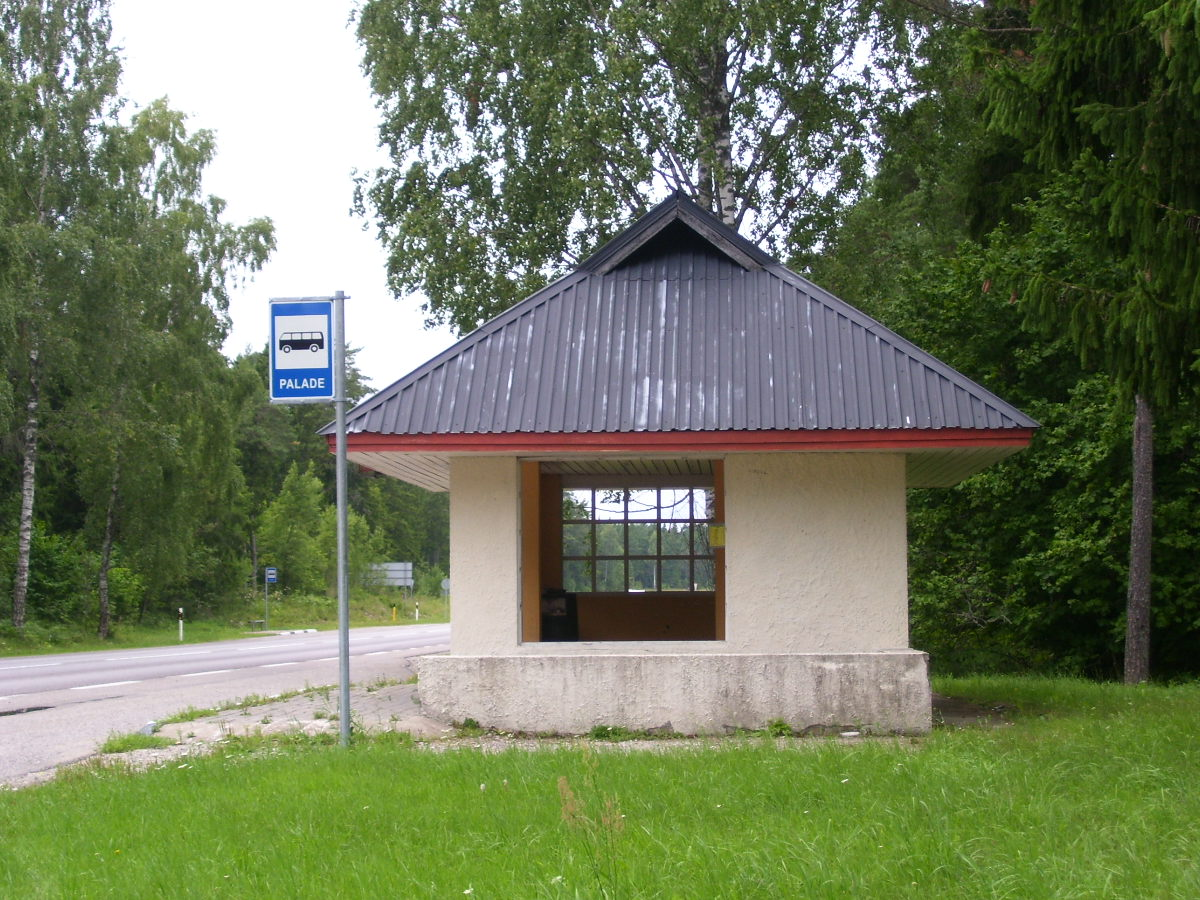
Palade bus stop

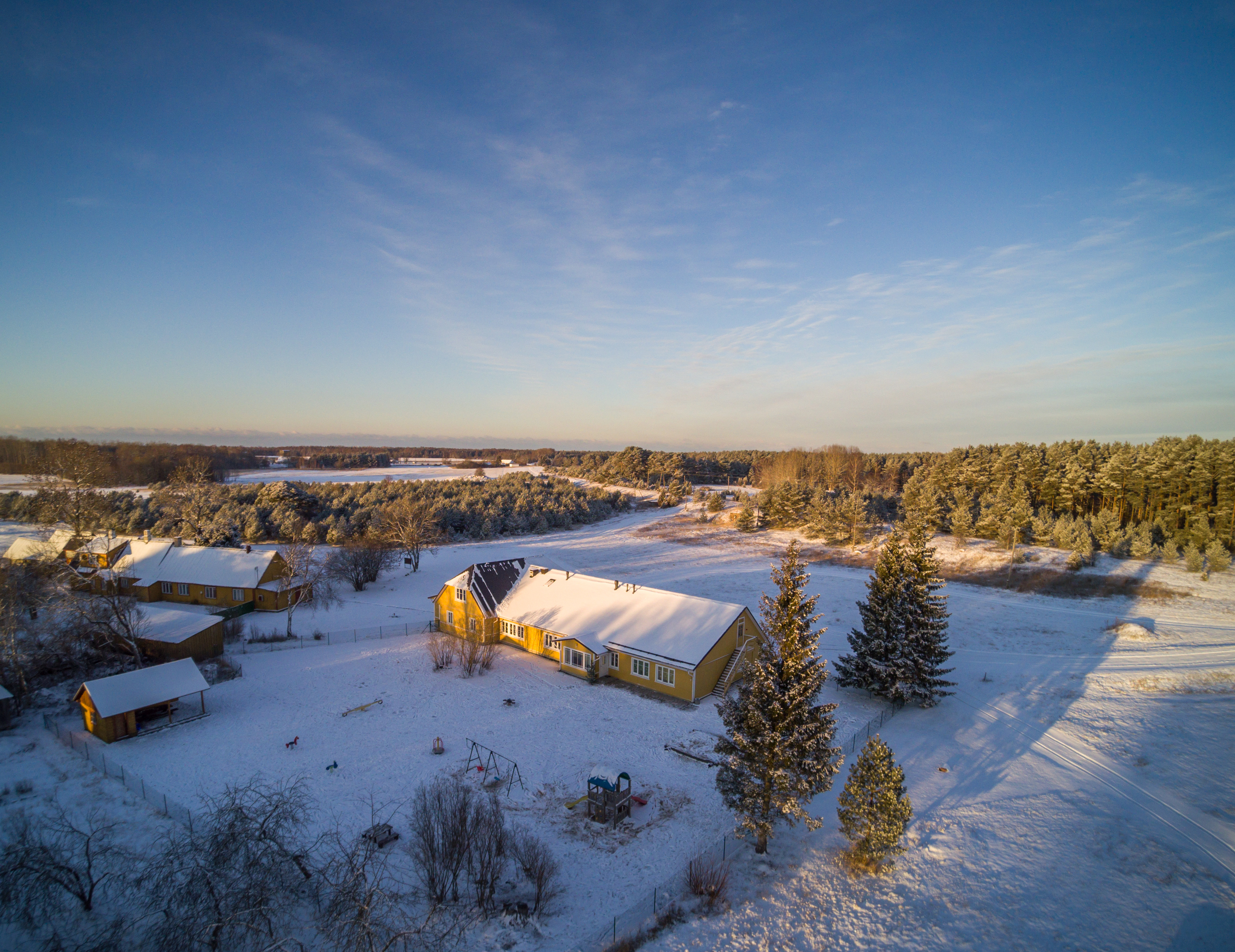
Palade kindergarten
