= Vohilaid =

Island in Estonia

Coordinates: 58°54′42″N 23°02′24″E

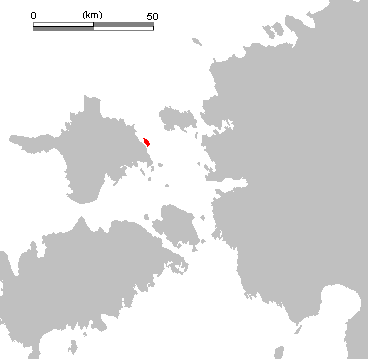
Vohilaid

Vohilaid (German: Wohhi) is a small Estonian island in the Hari Strait of the Väinameri in the Baltic Sea. It is approximately 416 hectares (1,030 acres) and the highest point is approximately ten feet (3.0 m) above sea level.
