= Hõralaid =

Island in Estonia

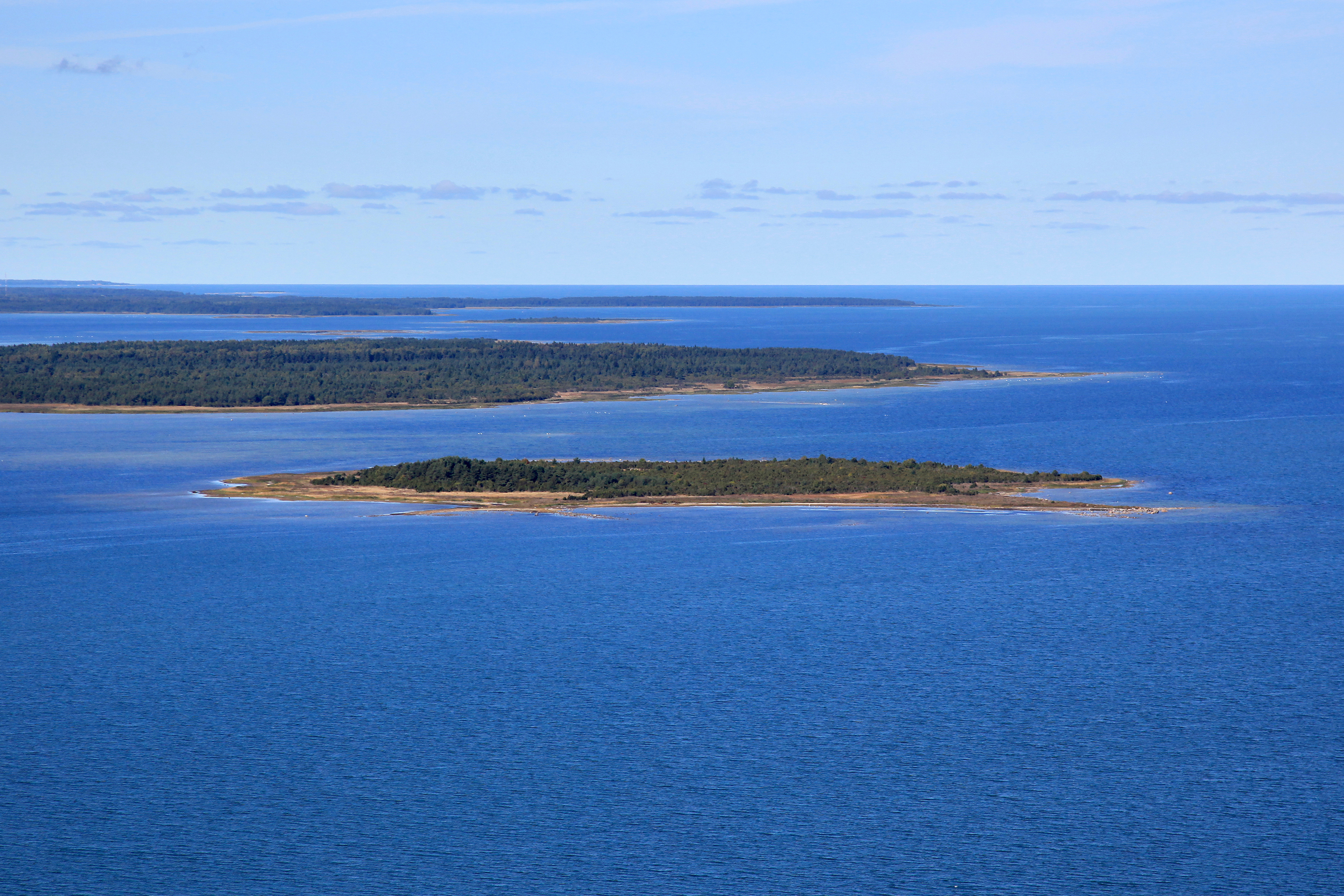
Aerial image of Hõralaid (smaller island) and Vohilaid.

Hõralaid is a small, uninhabited Estonian island of approximately 20 hectares in the Baltic Sea. The coordinates of Hõralaid are 58°53′55″N 23°04′26″E.

Hõralaid belongs to the village of Vahtrepa in Hiiumaa Parish and is administered by Hiiu County. It lies 1.5 km off the east coast of the island of Hiiumaa and is approximately 1.5 km southeast of the small island of Vohilaid. During normal sea water levels, the water depth between Hõralaid and Vohilaid is ca 0.6m, making the distance passable by walking in the sea.

== See also ==
- List of islands of Estonia
