= Sakla, Hiiu County =

Village in Hiiu County, Estonia

Sakla
- Village
- Location within Estonia
- Coordinates: 58°57′14″N 22°50′28″E
- Country: Estonia
- County: Hiiu County
- Parish: Hiiumaa Parish

Population (2021)
  - Total: 30
- Time zone: UTC+2 (EET)
  - Summer (DST): UTC+3 (EEST)

Sakla is a village in Hiiumaa Parish, Hiiu County, on the island of Hiiumaa in Estonia. As of the 2021 census, it has a population of 30.

== See also ==
- List of villages in Estonia
