= Hellamaa rahu =

Island in Estonia

Coordinates: 58.9514°N 22.9722°E

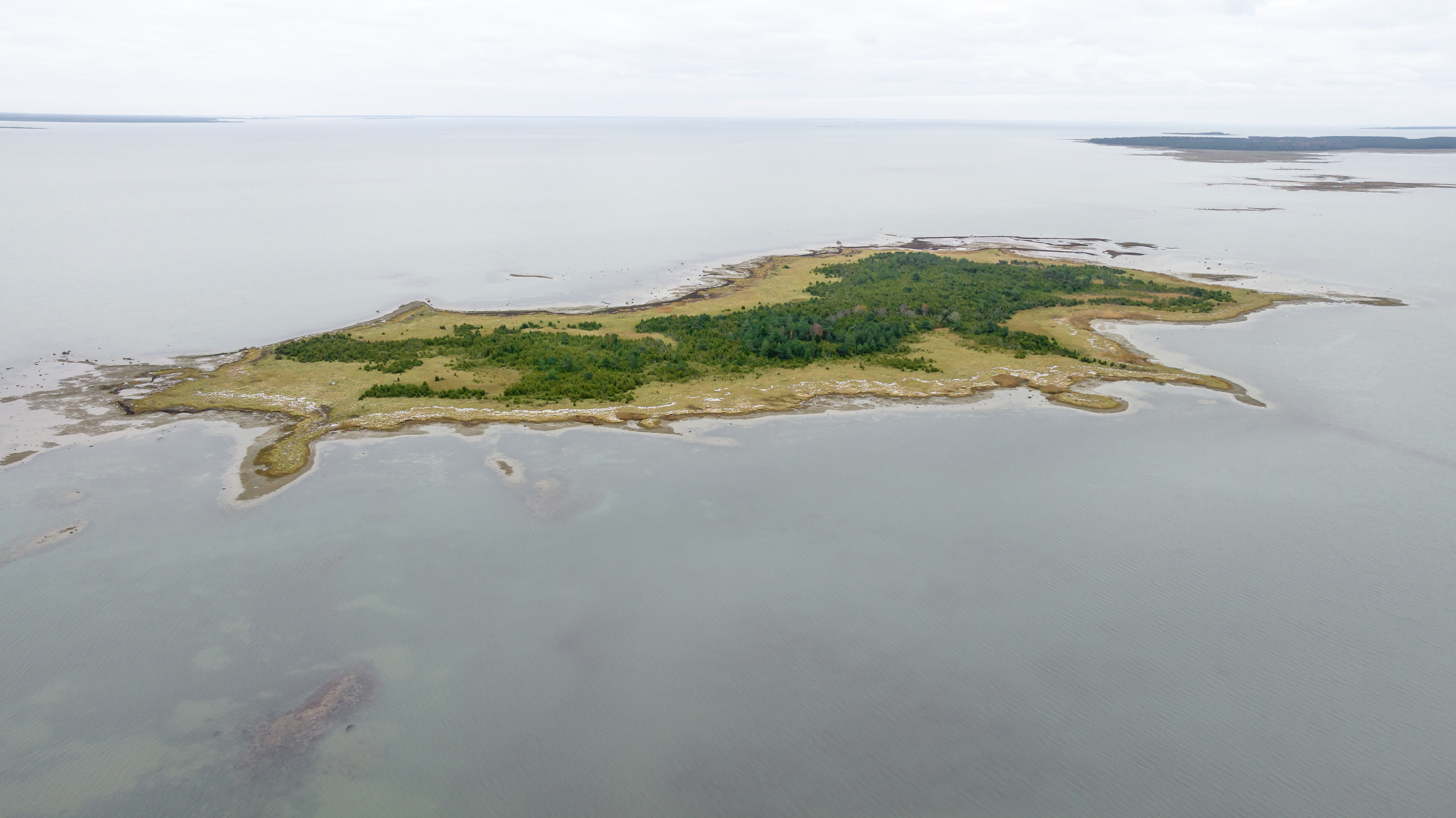
Hellamaa rahu

Hellamaa rahu is an island belonging to the country of Estonia.

== See also ==
- List of islands of Estonia
