= Väinameri =

Strait and sub-bay in the Baltic Sea

Coordinates: 58°45′00″N 23°05′00″E

The location of Väinameri in Estonia

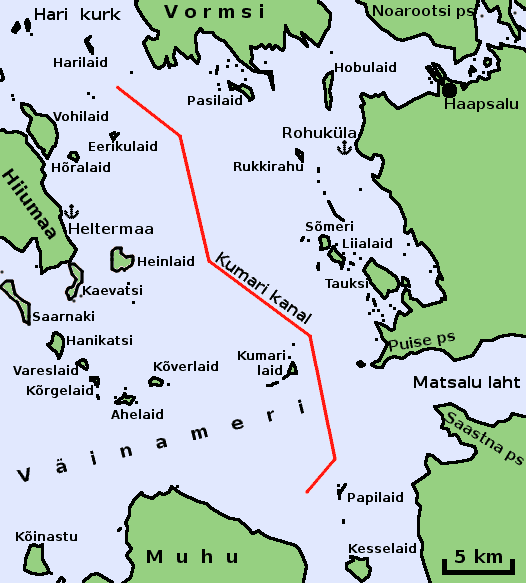
The course of the Kumari Channel

The Väinameri (Estonian for Strait Sea or Sea of Straits; German: Moonsund; English: Sound Sea) or Väinameri Sea is a strait and sub-bay of the Baltic Sea, located between the West Estonian Archipelago and the Estonian mainland, within western Estonia.

It is the northern section of the Gulf of Riga, extending north to the eastern Baltic Sea.

The area of the Väinameri Sea is about 2,200 square kilometres (850 sq mi).

The Väinameri Sea is home to the Väinameri Conservation area.

The Kumari Channel is a shipping lane running north–south in the Väinameri. It is 35 km long and has a minimum depth of five metres. The Rukki Channel runs east–west between Hiiumaa and the port of Rohuküla on the mainland.

In World War One it was the site of a major naval battle between Germany and Post Imperial Russia.

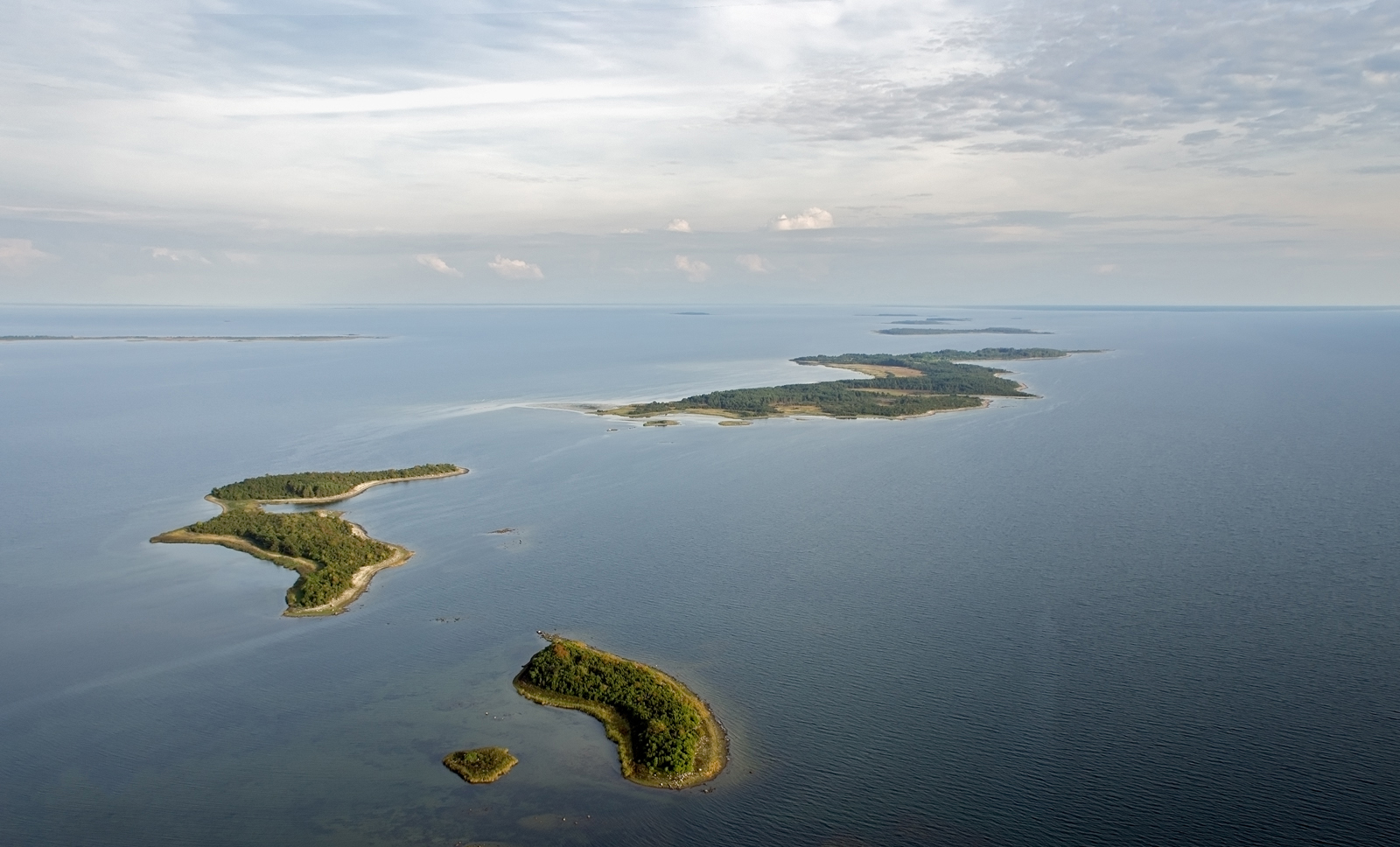
Small islets in the Väinameri

== See also ==
- Moonsund Regatta
