= Noogimaa =

Island in Estonia

Noogimaa is a small, uninhabited Estonian island in the Baltic Sea. Its coordinates are: 58°22′09″N 21°54′45″E.

Noogimaa lies just south of the island of Vilsandi and at the western tip of the island of Saaremaa. As such, is administered by Kihelkonna Parish in Saare County.

Noogimaa can be reached on foot by wading through the sea from Saaremaa (via the islands of Mihklirahu, Käkirahu and Kalarahu) or from Vilsandi.

== See also ==
- List of islands of Estonia
