= List of islands of Estonia =

- West Estonian archipelago
- Etymology: Name of Estonia

Geography
- Location: Central Europe
- Archipelago: West Estonian archipelago (Moonsund archipelago)
- Adjacent to: Baltic Sea; Gulf of Finland; Gulf of Riga
- Total islands: ~900
- Major islands: Saaremaa; Hiiumaa; Muhu; Vormsi
- Area: 3,933 km^{2} (1,519 sq mi)
- Highest elevation: 68 m (223 ft)
- Highest point: Tornimägi

Administration
- Estonia
- County: Saare; Hiiu; Lääne
- Capital and largest city: Tallinn (pop. 452,563)
- President: Alar Karis

Demographics
- Demonym: Estonian
- Population: 1,362,954 (2026)
- Population rank: 153rd
- Pop. density: 30.3/km^{2} (78.5/sq mi)
- Pop. density rank: 148th
- Languages: See Languages of Estonia
- Ethnic groups: See Ethnic groups in Estonia

This is an incomplete list of islands of Estonia. There are 2,355 islands in total.

== Large islands ==
Largest islands of Estonia, with an area 1 km^{2} or more Greater islands formed by a fixed link are shown in italics
No.	Name	Area (km^{2})	Population (2017)	Location	Connection to mainland	Picture
—N/a	Saaremaa and Muhu (Note: The causeway across the Väike Strait was opened in 1896.)	2,871	33,123	West Estonian archipelago	—N/a	—N/a
1	Saaremaa	2,673	31,304	West Estonian archipelago	Air link to Tallinn; car ferry via Muhu Island	
—N/a	Hiiumaa and Kassari (Note: Wooden bridges and later causeways have connected the islands of Hiiumaa and Kassari since the 17th century.)	1,008	9,335	West Estonian archipelago	—N/a	—N/a
2	Hiiumaa	989	8,995	West Estonian archipelago	Air link to Tallinn; car ferry to Rohuküla	
3	Muhu	198	1,819	West Estonian archipelago	Car ferry to Virtsu	
4	Vormsi	93	411	West Estonian archipelago	Car ferry to Rohuküla	
—N/a	Pakri Islands (Note: The causeway connecting the islands was built in 1952.)	24.7	5	Gulf of Finland	—N/a	—N/a
5	Kassari	19.3	340	West Estonian archipelago	Via Hiiumaa Island	
6	Naissaar	18.6	9	Gulf of Finland	Seasonal passenger ferry to Tallinn	
7	Kihnu	16.4	686	Gulf of Riga	Car ferry to Munalaid and Pärnu	
8	Väike-Pakri	12.9	5	Gulf of Finland	Seasonal passenger ferries to Kurkse and Paldiski	
9	Suur-Pakri	11.6	uninhabited	Gulf of Finland	Via Väike-Pakri Island	
10	Ruhnu	11.4	127	Gulf of Riga	Seasonal passenger ferries (with limited and seasonally adjusted car capacity) to Munalaid and Pärnu; Seasonal air traffic to Pärnu	
11	Abruka	8.8	30	West Estonian archipelago	Passenger ferry (with limited and seasonally-adjusted car capacity) to Roomassaare	
12	Vilsandi	8.8	22	West Estonian archipelago	Passenger ferry (with limited and seasonally-adjusted car capacity) to Papissaare and a limited-use track through shallow waters to Kuusnõmme, both on Saaremaa Island	
13	Piirissaar	7.8	99	Lake Peipus	Car ferry to Laaksaare; seasonal passenger cruise ferry to Tartu	
14	Prangli	6.4	169	Gulf of Finland	Car ferry to Leppneeme	
15	Osmussaar	4.6	5	Gulf of Finland	Seasonal tours from Dirhami	
16	Vohilaid	3.9	uninhabited	West Estonian archipelago	Limited-use track through shallow waters to Hiiumaa Island	
17	Aegna	2.9	11	Gulf of Finland	Seasonal passenger ferry to Tallinn	
18	Kõinastu	2.6	1	West Estonian archipelago	Limited-use track through shallow waters to Muhu Island	
19	Võilaid	2.5	uninhabited	West Estonian archipelago	Limited-use track through shallow waters to Muhu Island	
20	Tauksi	2.5	uninhabited	West Estonian archipelago	–	
21	Suurlaid	1.9	uninhabited	West Estonian archipelago	Limited-use track through shallow waters to Muhu Island	
22	Manilaid	1.9	52	Gulf of Riga	Car ferries and passenger ferries to Munalaid	
23	Väike-Tulpe	1.8	uninhabited	West Estonian archipelago	–	
24	Kesselaid	1.7	4	West Estonian archipelago	Charter passenger ferry	
25	Heinlaid	1.5	6	West Estonian archipelago	–	
26	Saarnaki laid	1.4	at least 5	West Estonian archipelago	–	
27	Kaevatsi	1.4	uninhabited	West Estonian archipelago	Limited-use track through shallow waters to Hiiumaa Island	
28	Liia	1.3	uninhabited	West Estonian archipelago	–	
29	Loonalaid	1.2	uninhabited	West Estonian archipelago	–	
30	Rammu	1.1	3	Gulf of Finland	–	

=== Map ===
Locations of large islands of Estonia

== Small islands ==
Islands of Estonia with an area less than 1 km^{2}
Name	Area (km^{2})	Location	Coordinates	Picture
Adralaid	0.01	Gulf of Riga	58°33′55″N 23°33′28″E	
Ahelaid	0.25	West Estonian archipelago	58°44′29″N 23°08′05″E	
Aherahu (Atla)	0.02	West Estonian archipelago	58°19′08″N 21°49′54″E	
Aherahu (Salinõmme)	0.001	West Estonian archipelago	58°44′56″N 23°08′04″E	
Ahessäär	0.06	Gulf of Riga	58°32′24″N 23°34′29″E	
Ahtra	0.001	Gulf of Riga	58°15′57″N 24°13′01″E	
Aksi	0.59	Gulf of Finland	59°35′59″N 25°05′23″E	
Allirahu (Matsalu)	0.001	West Estonian archipelago	58°45′11″N 23°40′52″E	
Allirahu (Suure-Rootsi)	0.03	Gulf of Riga	58°09′44″N 22°47′17″E	
Allirahu (Turja)	0.01	Gulf of Riga	58°17′58″N 22°58′11″E	
Allu	0.01	Gulf of Finland	59°34′16″N 25°14′31″E	
Alumine Vaigas	0.03	West Estonian archipelago	58°22′54″N 21°48′13″E	
Anekäbrud	0.01	West Estonian archipelago	58°26′31″N 23°15′21″E	
Ankrurahu	0.003	West Estonian archipelago	58°44′33″N 23°07′16″E	
Annilaid	0.03	Gulf of Riga	58°12′13″N 24°07′41″E	
Anulaid	0.03	West Estonian archipelago	58°27′08″N 23°15′26″E	
Auklaid	0.02	West Estonian archipelago	58°49′28″N 22°57′44″E	
Älvi		Gulf of Finland		
Eerikulaid	0.03	West Estonian archipelago	58°54′48″N 23°06′50″E	
Elmrahu	0.03	West Estonian archipelago	58°58′42″N 22°22′44″E	
Esirahu	0.02	West Estonian archipelago	58°47′30″N 23°27′47″E	
Hanemaa	0.02	West Estonian archipelago	58°49′45″N 23°22′21″E	
Hanerahu	0.01	West Estonian archipelago	58°44′37″N 23°05′53″E	
Hanikatsi laid	0.83	West Estonian archipelago	58°46′39″N 23°02′49″E	
Hara	0.10	Gulf of Finland	59°35′04″N 25°37′36″E	
Harilaid	0.15	West Estonian archipelago	58°58′17″N 23°05′00″E	
Härjakare	0.03	West Estonian archipelago	58°48′27″N 22°45′35″E	
Härjamaa	0.02	West Estonian archipelago	58°50′54″N 23°21′14″E	
Heinlaid (Värati)	0.19	Gulf of Riga	58°17′04″N 24°00′20″E	
Hellamaa rahu	0.18	West Estonian archipelago	58°57′02″N 22°58′23″E	
Hobulaid	0.89	West Estonian archipelago	58°56′37″N 23°23′07″E	
Hõralaid	0.23	West Estonian archipelago	58°54′00″N 23°03′50″E	
Hülgelaid	0.03	West Estonian archipelago	58°13′22″N 22°31′03″E	
Hülgerahu	0.002	West Estonian archipelago	58°45′05″N 23°11′08″E	
Imutilaid	0.02	Gulf of Riga	58°08′54″N 23°55′52″E	
Innarahu	0.01	West Estonian archipelago	58°16′55″N 21°48′51″E	
Joosepikuiv	0.001	West Estonian archipelago	58°21′49″N 21°51′57″E	
Kadakalaid	0.24	West Estonian archipelago	58°59′08″N 23°00′13″E	
Kajakarahu	0.01	West Estonian archipelago	58°57′12″N 23°30′48″E	
Käkimaa	0.43	West Estonian archipelago	58°21′47″N 21°55′49″E	
Käkirahu	0.0002	West Estonian archipelago	58°48′36″N 23°04′21″E	
Kakralaid	0.003	West Estonian archipelago	59°01′27″N 22°57′29″E	
Kakrarahu	0.02	West Estonian archipelago	58°46′01″N 23°25′47″E	
Kapussaare nasu	0.02	West Estonian archipelago	58°32′28″N 23°08′22″E	
Karirahu	0.01	West Estonian archipelago	58°23′02″N 21°48′01″E	
Kasselaid	0.50	Gulf of Riga	58°08′33″N 22°32′33″E	
Keri	0.03	Gulf of Finland	59°41′57″N 25°01′18″E	
Keskmine Vaigas	0.01	West Estonian archipelago	58°22′44″N 21°48′02″E	
Kibissäär	0.01	Gulf of Riga	58°32′30″N 23°34′07″E	
Kirjurahu	0.05	Gulf of Riga	58°06′00″N 22°33′22″E	
Kitselaid	0.08	Gulf of Riga	58°27′16″N 23°40′32″E	
Kõbajalaid	0.10	West Estonian archipelago	58°35′36″N 23°30′20″E	
Koerakuiv	0.01	West Estonian archipelago	58°18′51″N 21°49′58″E	
Koipsi	0.36	Gulf of Finland	59°32′42″N 25°16′13″E	
Kõrgelaid	0.14	West Estonian archipelago	58°45′14″N 23°05′43″E	
Kõrksaar	0.91	Gulf of Riga	58°20′20″N 23°46′52″E	
Kõverlaid	0.30	West Estonian archipelago	58°45′11″N 23°10′18″E	
Kreenholm	0.13	Narva River	59°21′28″N 28°11′50″E	
Kriimi laid	0.03	West Estonian archipelago	58°08′23″N 22°09′04″E	
Kräsuli	0.17	Gulf of Finland	59°34′29″N 24°47′11″E	
Kuivarahu (Mäeküla)	0.08	West Estonian archipelago	58°52′03″N 23°23′33″E	
Kuivarahu (Põgari-Sassi)	0.001	West Estonian archipelago	58°50′23″N 23°25′06″E	
Kuivarahu (Rootsiküla)	0.02	West Estonian archipelago	58°21′49″N 21°58′10″E	
Kuivarahu (Salinõmme)	0.0005	West Estonian archipelago	58°49′23″N 22°58′15″E	
Kuivarahu (Vilsandi)	0.01	West Estonian archipelago	58°22′17″N 21°51′18″E	
Külalaid	0.16	West Estonian archipelago	58°58′54″N 22°23′49″E	
Kullikare	0.0003	West Estonian archipelago	58°24′09″N 23°05′40″E	
Kullipank	0.001	West Estonian archipelago	58°22′40″N 21°48′25″E	
Kumari laid	0.18	West Estonian archipelago	58°45′43″N 23°20′39″E	
Kumbli	0.02	Gulf of Finland	59°34′33″N 24°47′40″E	
Kunnati laid	0.05	West Estonian archipelago	58°22′01″N 22°57′42″E	
Kurgurahu	0.04	West Estonian archipelago	58°20′18″N 21°55′45″E	
Laasirahu	0.07	West Estonian archipelago	58°21′45″N 21°50′49″E	
Laidu	0.19	West Estonian archipelago	58°31′16″N 22°16′46″E	
Läkumätas	0.01	West Estonian archipelago	58°13′39″N 22°32′23″E	
Langekare	0.01	West Estonian archipelago	58°48′17″N 23°08′30″E	
Leemetikare	0.002	West Estonian archipelago	58°41′04″N 23°12′00″E	
Liivakari	0.01	Gulf of Finland	59°27′52″N 24°34′25″E	
Liivanuka ots	0.02	West Estonian archipelago	58°45′54″N 22°43′08″E	
Linnusitamaa	0.05	Gulf of Riga	58°07′12″N 22°30′38″E	
Lombimaa	0.001	West Estonian archipelago	57°54′06″N 22°02′27″E	
Luigerahu	0.002	West Estonian archipelago	58°44′25″N 23°08′45″E	
Mihklirahu	0.02	West Estonian archipelago	58°21′08″N 21°52′20″E	
Mohni	0.62	Gulf of Finland	59°40′41″N 25°48′09″E	
Mõndalaid	0.45	West Estonian archipelago	58°13′45″N 21°59′41″E	
Munaderahu	0.003	West Estonian archipelago	58°18′02″N 22°55′33″E	
Munasaar	0.004	Gulf of Finland	59°33′06″N 26°34′10″E	
Mustarahu	0.15	West Estonian archipelago	58°48′31″N 23°26′32″E	
Mustpank	0.17	West Estonian archipelago	58°22′48″N 21°48′35″E	
Nabralaid	0.03	West Estonian archipelago	58°26′00″N 23°09′58″E	
Naistekivimaa	0.18	West Estonian archipelago	58°14′25″N 21°54′56″E	
Ninalaid	0.05	West Estonian archipelago	58°59′54″N 22°26′09″E	
Noogimaa	0.37	West Estonian archipelago	58°22′23″N 21°54′01″E	
Nootamaa	0.05	West Estonian archipelago	58°19′24″N 21°45′59″E	
Öakse laid	0.08	West Estonian archipelago	58°49′26″N 22°58′38″E	
Ojurahu	0.09	West Estonian archipelago	58°21′26″N 21°52′27″E	
Öörahu	0.001	West Estonian archipelago	58°46′56″N 23°26′57″E	
Oosäär	0.02	Gulf of Riga	58°30′19″N 23°39′34″E	
Ooslamaa	0.05	West Estonian archipelago	58°05′41″N 22°07′06″E	
Orikalaid	0.0001	Gulf of Riga	58°27′53″N 23°39′36″E	
Paelaid	0.05	West Estonian archipelago	58°24′51″N 23°10′01″E	
Paljarahu	0.03	West Estonian archipelago	58°48′03″N 23°26′37″E	
Papilaid	0.10	West Estonian archipelago	58°40′58″N 23°24′21″E	
Papirahu	0.01	West Estonian archipelago	58°39′46″N 23°24′27″E	
Pasilaid	0.50	West Estonian archipelago	58°56′34″N 23°17′00″E	
Pedassaar	0.90	Gulf of Finland	59°30′51″N 25°22′30″E	
Pihanasv	0.004	West Estonian archipelago	58°22′01″N 22°57′42″E	
Pihlalaid	0.02	West Estonian archipelago	58°26′35″N 23°16′41″E	
Piiukaarelaid	0.08	Gulf of Riga	58°27′37″N 23°39′20″E	
Pikknasv	0.01	West Estonian archipelago	58°17′57″N 22°55′06″E	
Pitkasääremaa	0.02	West Estonian archipelago	57°53′08″N 22°02′14″E	
Põdvalaid		West Estonian archipelago		
Põiksäär		West Estonian archipelago		
Pöörilaid		Gulf of Riga		
Pühadekare		West Estonian archipelago		
Puhtulaid				
Punasekivirahu				
Puningalaid		West Estonian archipelago		
Püskumadal		West Estonian archipelago		
Ramsi				
Rannasitik		West Estonian archipelago		
Reigilaid (Orjaku)	0.30	West Estonian archipelago	58°47′43″N 22°45′23″E	
Reigilaid (Rootsi)	0.95	West Estonian archipelago	58°59′27″N 22°29′35″E	
Riinurahu		West Estonian archipelago		
Ristlaid		West Estonian archipelago		
Rohurahu		West Estonian archipelago		
Rohusi		Gulf of Finland		
Rooglaid		West Estonian archipelago	58.4494°N 23.2728°E	
Ruilaid	0.13	Gulf of Riga	58°32′20″N 23°34′41″E	
Rukkirahu		West Estonian archipelago		
Ruserahu		West Estonian archipelago		
Rusulaid		West Estonian archipelago		
Saare ots				
Säärerahu				
Sala	0.03	Gulf of Finland	59°39′17″N 26°32′10″E	
Salavamaa		West Estonian archipelago		
Sangelaid		Gulf of Riga		
Saunrahu				
Seasaar		West Estonian archipelago		
Selglaid		Gulf of Riga		
Sepasitik		West Estonian archipelago		
Siiakare				
Siiasaar		West Estonian archipelago		
Siimurahu		West Estonian archipelago		
Sillalaid		Gulf of Riga		
Sipelgarahu		West Estonian archipelago		
Sitakare		West Estonian archipelago	58.8254°N 22.9617°E	
Sokulaid		West Estonian archipelago		
Sõmeri		West Estonian archipelago		
Sorgu	0.05	Gulf of Riga	58°10′42″N 24°11′59″E	
Suur Antsulaiud	0.04	West Estonian archipelago	58°20′45″N 21°59′28″E	
Suur Kolmekivirahu				
Suur Pihlakare	0.004	West Estonian archipelago	58°49′43″N 22°58′28″E	
Suuregi laid		West Estonian archipelago		
Suurepoldi				
Suurrahu		West Estonian archipelago		
Tagarahu		West Estonian archipelago		
Taguküla laid		West Estonian archipelago		
Täkulaid		West Estonian archipelago		
Täkunasv		West Estonian archipelago		
Tallukrava	.0008	Gulf of Riga	58°11′06″N 23°57′25″E	
Tarja		West Estonian archipelago		
Tarjamaa				
Telve		West Estonian archipelago		
Tiirloo		Gulf of Finland		
Tondirahu		West Estonian archipelago		
Tondisaar		Lake Võrtsjärv		
Tõõdilaid		West Estonian archipelago		
Udrikulaid		West Estonian archipelago		
Uhtju	0.08	Gulf of Finland	59°40′36″N 26°30′39″E	
Ülemine Vaigas	0.02	West Estonian archipelago	58°22′30″N 21°48′01″E	
Ulkkari		Gulf of Finland		
Umalakotid		West Estonian archipelago		
Umblu		Gulf of Finland		
Urverahu		West Estonian archipelago		
Uuemaarahu		West Estonian archipelago		
Uuemererahu		West Estonian archipelago		
Uulutilaid		Gulf of Riga		
Uus-Nootamaa		West Estonian archipelago		
Uusikuiv				
Vahase		West Estonian archipelago		
Vahelmisrahu		West Estonian archipelago		
Vaika islands		West Estonian archipelago		
Väike Antsulaiud	0.02	West Estonian archipelago	58°20′44″N 21°59′16″E	
Väike Kolmekivirahu				
Väike Pihlakare	0.002	West Estonian archipelago	58°49′46″N 22°58′20″E	
Väike Siimurahu		West Estonian archipelago		
Vaindloo	0.07	Gulf of Finland	59°49′2″N 26°21′37″E	
Valgerahu		West Estonian archipelago		
Vareslaid (Käina)		West Estonian archipelago		
Vareslaid (Väinameri)		Gulf of Riga		
Varesrahu		West Estonian archipelago		
Varsarahu				
Vasikakuiv				
Vasikalaid		West Estonian archipelago		
Vesiloo		West Estonian archipelago		
Veistelaid	0.03	West Estonian archipelago	58°28′12″N 23°09′28″E	
Vesitükimaa		West Estonian archipelago		
Viirekare				
Viirelaid		West Estonian archipelago		
Vissulaid		West Estonian archipelago		
Võrgukare	0.002	West Estonian archipelago	58°22′15″N 23°03′02″E	
Võrkrahu		West Estonian archipelago		

== See also ==
- List of islands in the Baltic Sea
- List of islands
