= Reigilaid =

Reigilaid may refer to:

- Reigilaid (Orjaku), a former islet in Orjaku, Estonia
- Reigilaid (Rootsi), a former islet in Rootsi, Estonia
