= Vareslaid =

Vareslaid may refer to:

- Vareslaid (Käina), an island of Estonia
- Vareslaid (Väinameri), an island of Estonia
