= Puningalaid =

Island in Estonia

Coordinates: 58°19′31″N 22°56′44″E

Puningalaid is an island belonging in Estonia; it has an area of one hectare and is located in the village of Turja.

== See also ==
List of islands of Estonia
