= Laidu Island Nature Reserve =

Protected area in Estonia

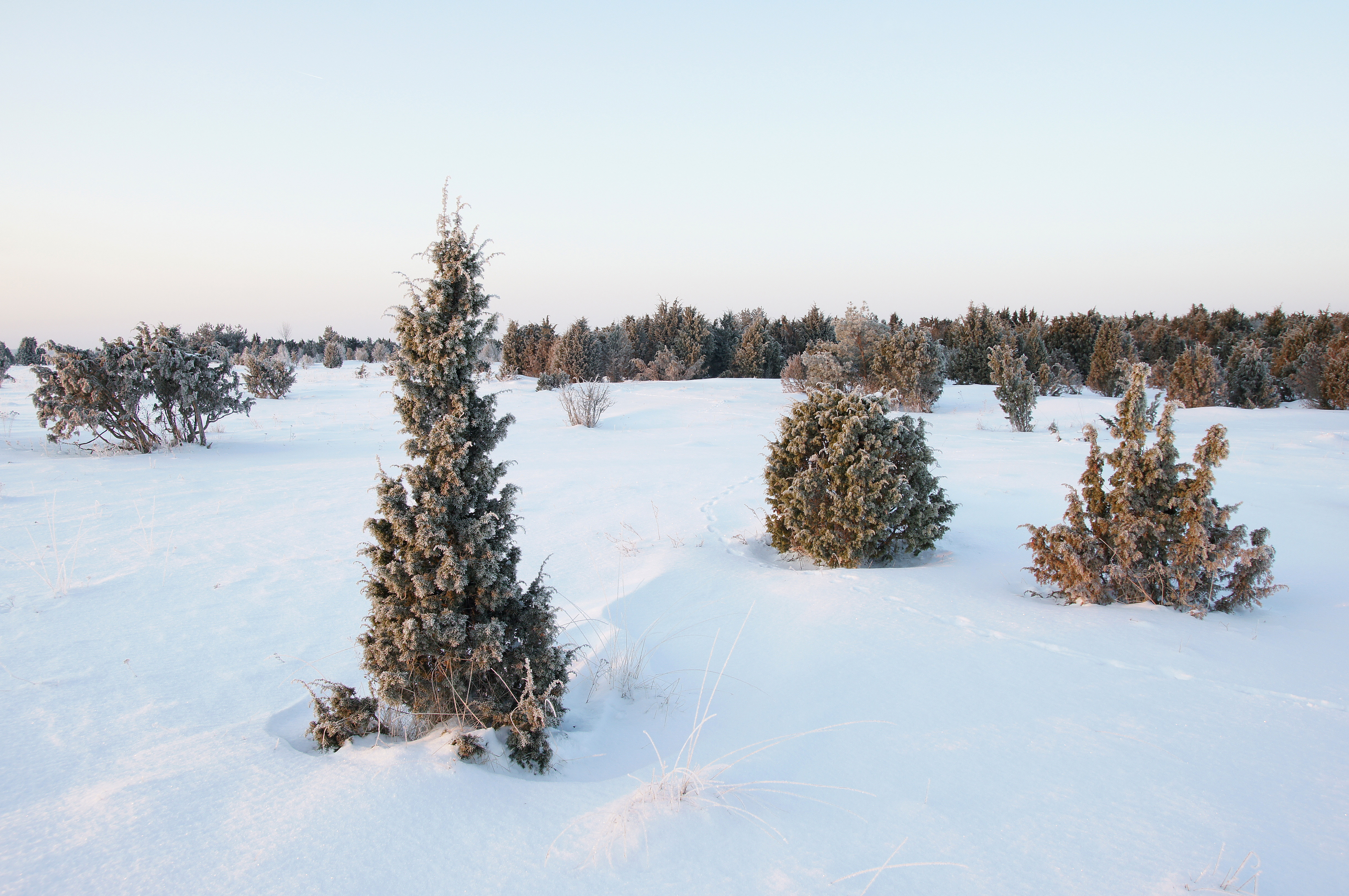

- Location within Estonia
- Location: Estonia
- Coordinates: 58°31′20″N 22°16′40″E
- Area: 19 ha (47 acres)
- Established: 1965 (2017)

Laidu Island Nature Reserve is a nature reserve which is located in Saare County, Estonia.

The area of the nature reserve is 19 ha.

The protected area was founded in 1965 to protect avifauna in Laidu Island. In 2004 the protected area was designated to the nature reserve.
