= Pöörilaid =

Islet belonging to Estonia, located in the Baltic Sea

Coordinates: 58°27′40″N 23°37′46″E

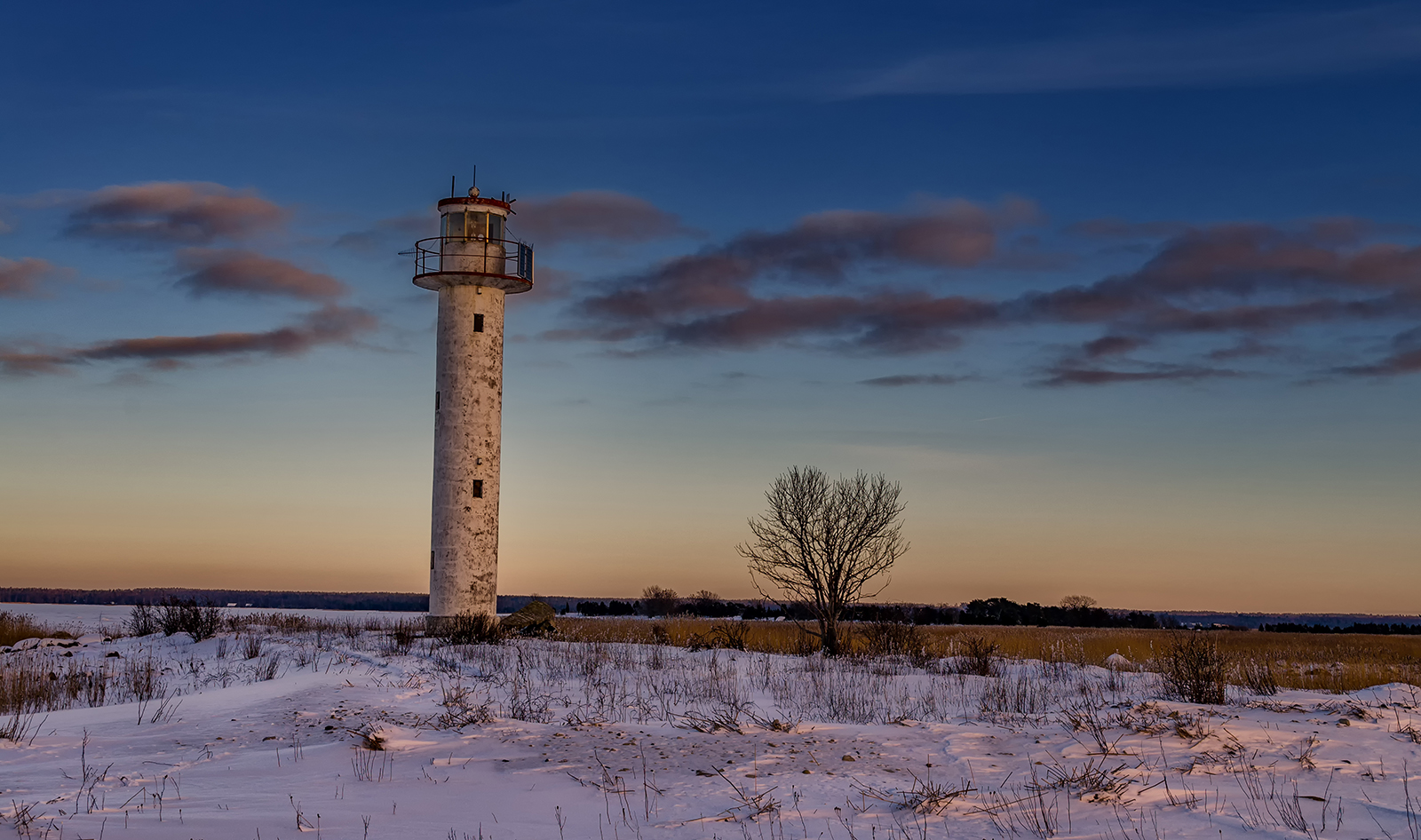
Pöörilaiu lighthouse

Pöörilaid (alternately: Pööriotsa laid) is an islet in the Baltic Sea belonging to the country of Estonia.

Pöörilaid covers approximately 0.0195 hectares, with a perimeter of 1.7 kilometers. The islet has a sinuous coastline and has, through natural process, become connected to the islet of Selglaid. The islet is fully protected since 1976 as part of the Sparrow Islets Landscape reserve (Estonian: Varbla laidude maastikukaitseala), and is an important breeding site for 54 species of birds.

Pöörilaid belongs administratively to Lääneranna Parish in Pärnu County. A fully operational lighthouse has been in use on the island since its construction in 1939, and is maintained by the Estonian Maritime Administration.

== See also ==
List of islands of Estonia
