= Kunnatilaid =

Island in Estonia

Coordinates: 58.3670°N 22.9616°E

Kunnatilaid is an island belonging to the country of Estonia.

== See also ==
- List of islands of Estonia
