= Pakulaid =

Island in Estonia

Coordinates: 58°38′N 22°33′E

Pakulaid is an island belonging to the country of Estonia.

== See also ==
List of islands of Estonia
