= Rammu (village) =

Village in Estonia

- Village
- Location within Estonia
- Coordinates: 59.5733°N 25.2106°E
- Country: Estonia
- County: Harju County
- Parish: Jõelähtme Parish
- Time zone: UTC+2 (EET)
  - Summer (DST): UTC+3 (EEST)

Rammu is a village in Jõelähtme Parish, Harju County in Estonia. The village comprises Rammu island, Allu island and Malusi islands.
