= Allirahu Nature Reserve =

Protected area in Estonia

- Interactive map of Allirahu Nature Reserve
- Location: Estonia
- Coordinates: 58.159°N 22.796°E
- Area: 1,971 ha (4,870 acres)
- Established: 2005

Allirahu Nature Reserve is a nature reserve which is located in Saare County, Estonia.

The area of the nature reserve is 1971 ha.

The protected area was founded in 2005 to protect valuable habitat types and threatened species on Allirahu.
