= Liivanuka ots =

Island in Estonia

Coordinates: 58°46′0.69″N 22°43′17.74″E

Liivanuka ots is an Estonian islet with surface area of 0.0059 hectares. It is a sandy, oval-shaped islet, stretching in a north-south direction. It lies southeast of the island of Hiiumaa in the Jausa rand, next to the islet of Hanerahu. Liivanuka ots is part of Hiiumaa Parish, Hiiu County. The islet belongs to Hiiumaa Islets Landscape Reserve.

== See also ==
- List of islands of Estonia
