= Pihlakare =

Island in Estonia

Coordinates: 58°49′43.27″N 22°58′28.64″E

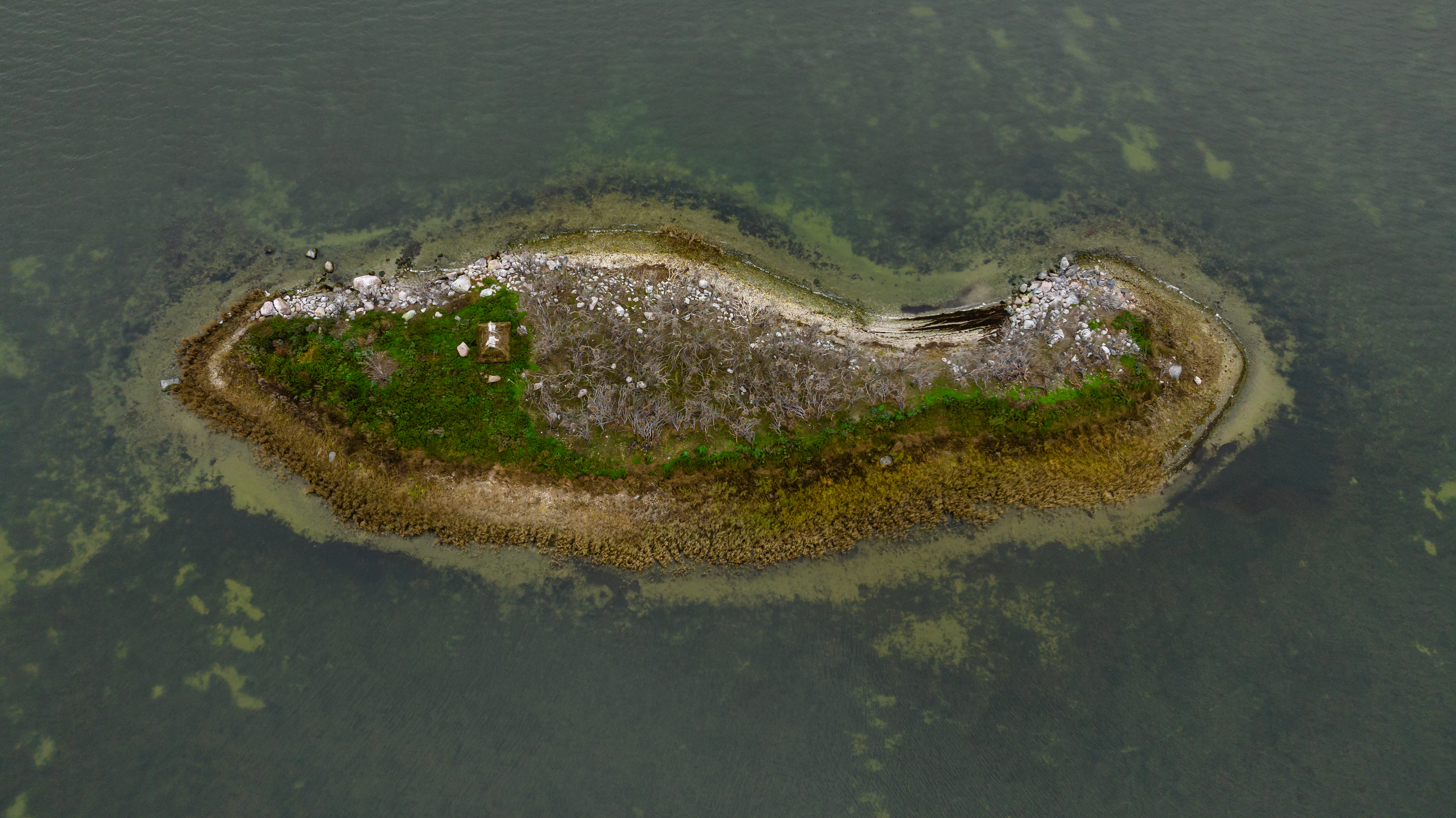
Philakare Island

Pihlakare is an island belonging to the country of Estonia.

== See also ==
- List of islands of Estonia
