= Telve (disambiguation) =

Telve may refer to:

- Telve, municipality in Trentino in the northern Italian region Trentino-Alto Adige/Südtirol
- Telve, an island on the Baltic Sea
- Telve di Sopra, municipality in Trentino in the northern Italian region Trentino-Alto Adige/Südtirol
