= Küllisäär =

Island in Estonia

Geography
- Location: Baltic Sea
- Coordinates: 58°11′06″N 23°57′25″E

Administration
- Estonia

Küllisäär is an island belonging to the country of Estonia.

== See also ==
- List of islands of Estonia
