= Umalakotid =

Island in Estonia

Coordinates: 58.3469°N 21.9297°E

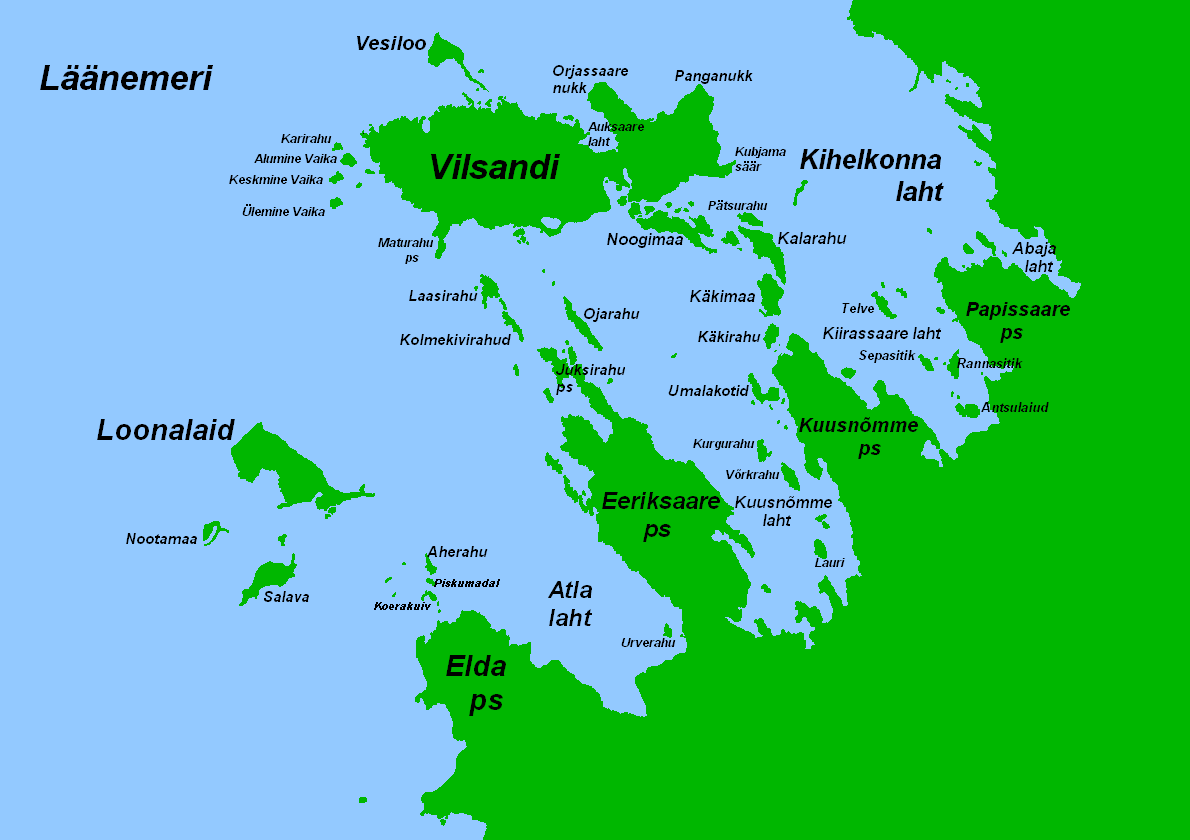
Map showing Umalakotid and neighbouring islands

Umalakotid is an island belonging to the country of Estonia. It is part of Vilsandi National Park.

== See also ==
- List of islands of Estonia
