= Väike-Tulpe =

Island in Estonia

- Interactive map of Väike-Tulpe

Geography
- Location: Gulf of Riga
- Coordinates: 58.20353717856208°N 22.59219468488388°E
- Area: 208,672 ha (515,640 acres)
- Coastline: 11,278 km (7007.8 mi)
- Highest elevation: 2.6 m (8.5 ft)

Väike-Tulpe is a 2.09 km² island in Saare County, Estonia on the southern coast of Saaremaa in the Gulf of Riga, administratively belonging to the Muratsi village area of Saaremaa Parish (formerly in the Lääne-Saare Parish). The island's coastline is 11.2 kilometres long and it's located 3.5 km southeast of Roomassaare Harbour. Its name means "Small Tulip" in Estonian.

The island is covered in scrub and is part of the Kasti Bay conservation area. The island consists mainly of moraine and is covered with juniper, coastal meadow and reeds.

== See also ==
List of islands of Estonia
