= Valgerahu =

Island in Estonia

Coordinates: 58.7792°N 23.3428°E

Valgerahu is an island in the Väinameri Sea that comprises part of Matsalu National Park. Valgerahu is located in the West Estonian archipelago.

== See also ==
- List of islands of Estonia
