= Ankrurahu =

Island in Estonia

Coordinates: 58.7426°N 23.1211°E

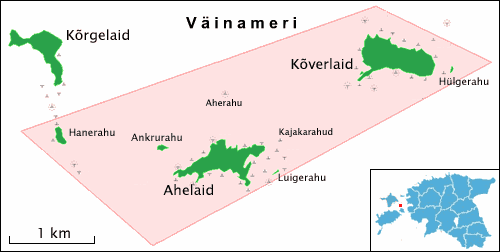
Ankrurahu and the surrounding area

Ankrurahu is an island in Estonia's West Estonian archipelago. The island has an area of 0.291362 hectares and an approximate height of 2 metres. Ankrurahu lies within the Hiiumaa Islets Landscape Conservation Area. The island is sandy and rocky.

== See also ==
- List of islands of Estonia
