= Varesrahu =

Island in Estonia

Coordinates: 58.7652°N 23.0662°E

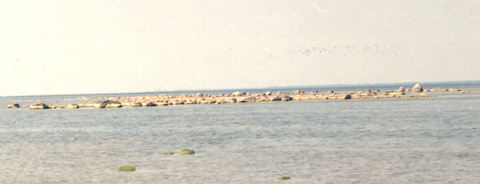
View of Varesrahu Island

Varesrahu is an island belonging to the country of Estonia.

== See also ==
- List of islands of Estonia
