= Paelaid =

Island in Estonia

Coordinates: 58°25′N 23°11′E

Paelaid is an island belonging to the country of Estonia.

Paelaid is administered by Saare County.

== See also ==
- List of islands of Estonia
