= Adralaid =

Island in Estonia

Coordinates: 58.5653°N 23.5578°E

Adralaid is a small islet belonging to Virtsu, a small borough in Lääneranna Parish, Pärnu County, Estonia.

It is part of the Puhtu-Laelatu Nature Reserve.

== See also ==
- List of islands of Estonia
