= Sillalaid =

Island in Estonia

Coordinates: 58°11′N 23°54′E

Sillalaid is an island belonging to the country of Estonia.

The island is in the Gulf of Riga and is close proximity to the Estonian mainland.

Sillalaid is a uninhabited island that is part of Pärnu County, Estonia.

== See also ==
- List of islands of Estonia
