= Öakse =

Island in Estonia

Coordinates: 58°44′48″N 22°48′21″E

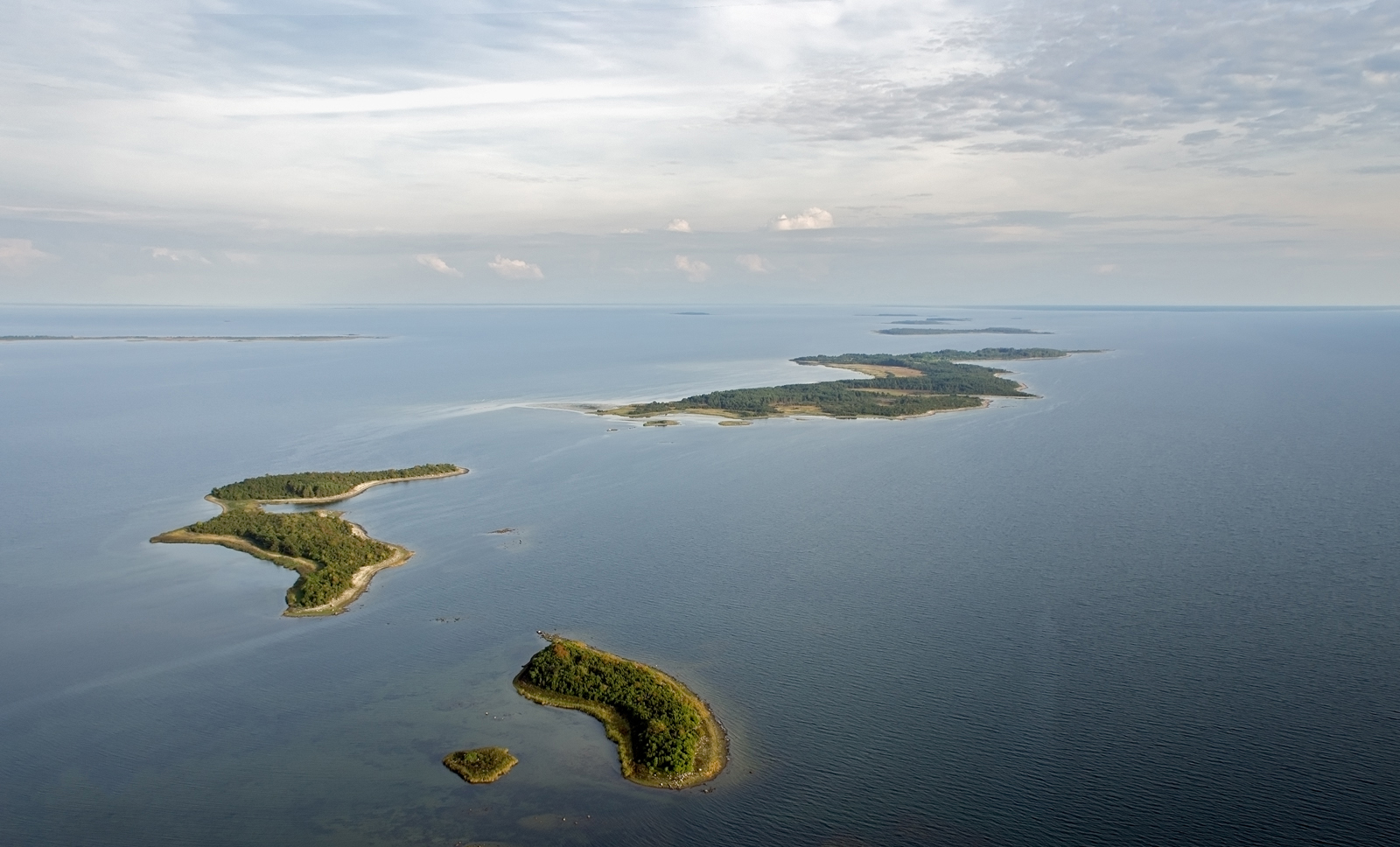
View of the Öakse Island region

Öakse (alternately: Öakse laid, or Pärglaid) is an island in the Baltic Sea belonging to the country of Estonia.

Öakse comprises 7.6 hectares in area and is located in the Soonlepa Bay, approximately one km from the Salinõmme Peninsula on the larger island of Hiiumaa to the west and approximately 300 km from the smaller islet of Auklaid which lies to the west and is administered by Hiiu County. The island is part of the Hiiumaa Islets Landscape Conservation Area. Öakse is elongated in a northwest-southeast direction, and crescent-shaped. The shoreline is sinuous and the south-east tip of the island is rocky and concludes with a set of large boulders. It is approximately 8.2 m above sea level.

The island is overgrown with various types of reeds, fescue and junipers. On the western and eastern edges of the island stand upland forests of elm and juniper.
