= Anulaid =

Island in Estonia

- Location in the Baltic Sea region Location in Europe

Geography
- Location: Baltic Sea
- Coordinates: 58°27′N 23°15′E
- Archipelago: West Estonian archipelago
- Area: 2.8 ha (6.9 acres)
- Length: 1 km (0.6 mi)

Administration
- Estonia
- County: Saare County

Additional information
- Time zone: (GMT+3)

Anulaid (alternatively: Aru saar and Anu saar) is an uninhabited island belonging to the country of Estonia.

Anulaid is 1 km long and covers 2.8 ha in area. It is located on the northwest coast of Muraja Bay off the southeastern part of Saaremaa and administratively belongs to the village of Kakuna in Saaremaa Municipality. Anulaid belongs to the Kahtla-Kübassaare Hoiuala Limited-Conservation Area and is under nature protection.

== See also ==
- List of islands of Estonia
