= Pasilaid =

Island in Estonia

Coordinates: 58°56′N 23°17′E

Pasilaid or Pasja is an island belonging to the country of Estonia.

== See also ==
- List of islands of Estonia
