= Ooslamaa =

Island in Estonia

Coordinates: 58°05′30″N 22°07′43″E

Ooslamaa is a small islet in the Baltic Sea belonging to the country of Estonia.

Ooslamaa has a surface area of 241.60 hectares, with fragmented vegetation. Trees do not grow on the islet. It is administered by Saaremaa Parish, Saare County and has been designated as a Habitat/species management area of Nature Reserve and been under protection by the government since 1965.

== See also ==
- List of islands of Estonia

== Literature ==
- Raukas, A., Bird, E., Orviku, K. 1994. The Provenance of Beaches on the Estonian Islands of Saaremaa and Hiiumaa. - Proc. Estonian Acad. Of Sci. Geol., 43, 2, 81–92.
