= Suur Poldilaid =

Island in Estonia

Coordinates: 58°26′45″N 23°15′01″E

Suur Poldilaid is an island belonging to the country of Estonia.

== See also ==
- List of islands of Estonia
