= Sangelaid =

Island in Estonia

Coordinates: 58.1989°N 23.9117°E

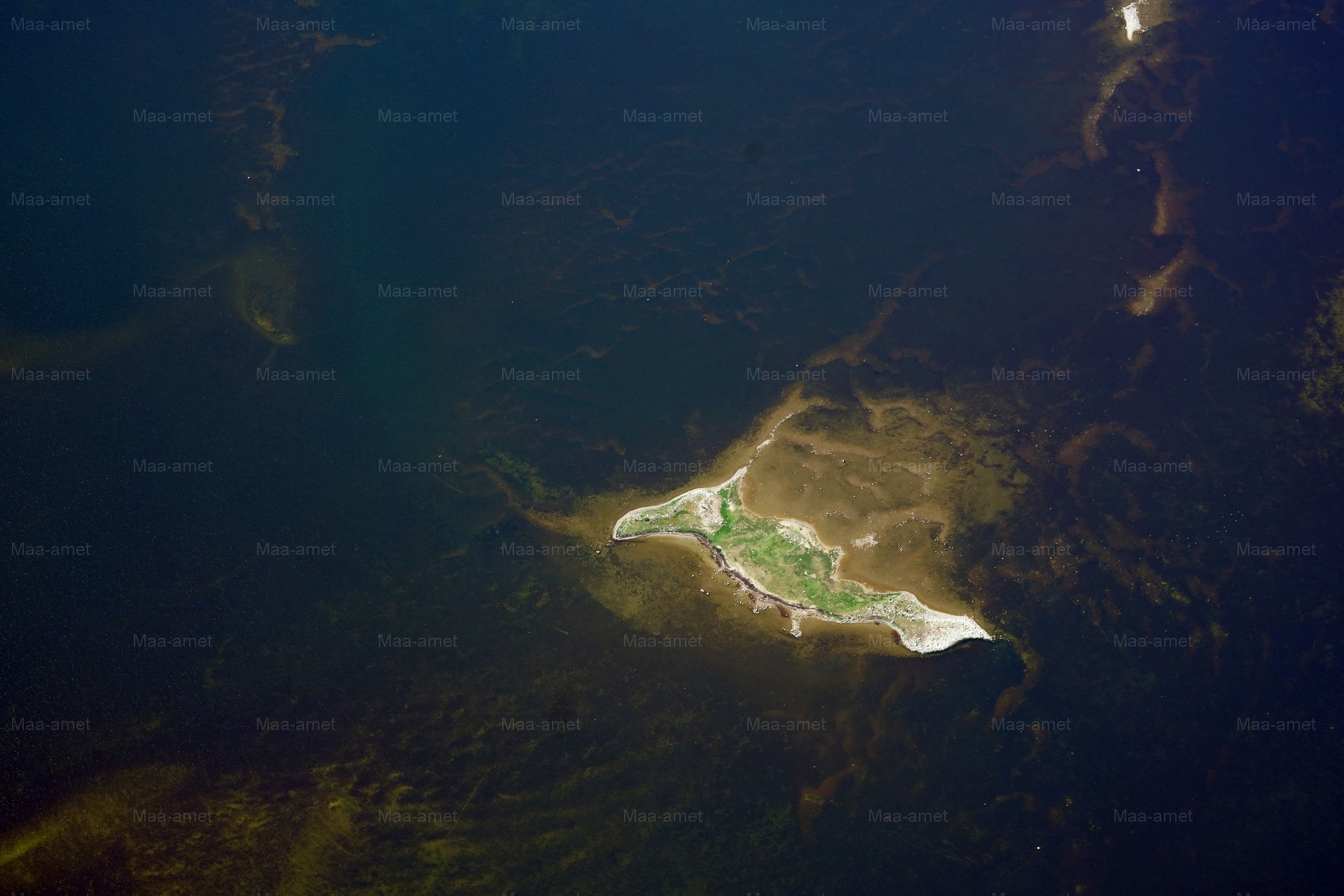
Sangõ

Sangelaid is an island belonging to the country of Estonia.

== See also ==
- List of islands of Estonia
