= Tarja (island) =

Island in Estonia

- Location within Estonia

Geography
- Location: Baltic Sea
- Coordinates: 58°26′42″N 21°54′37″E
- County: Saare County

Tarjamaa, or Tarja, is an island belonging to the country of Estonia in its western archipelago. This island is a part of Saaremaa Parish, Saare County and is currently uninhabited. It is only a short distance west from the nearest village of Kõruse. The island is part of Vilsandi National Park.

== See also ==
- List of islands of Estonia
