= Kajakarahu =

Island in Estonia

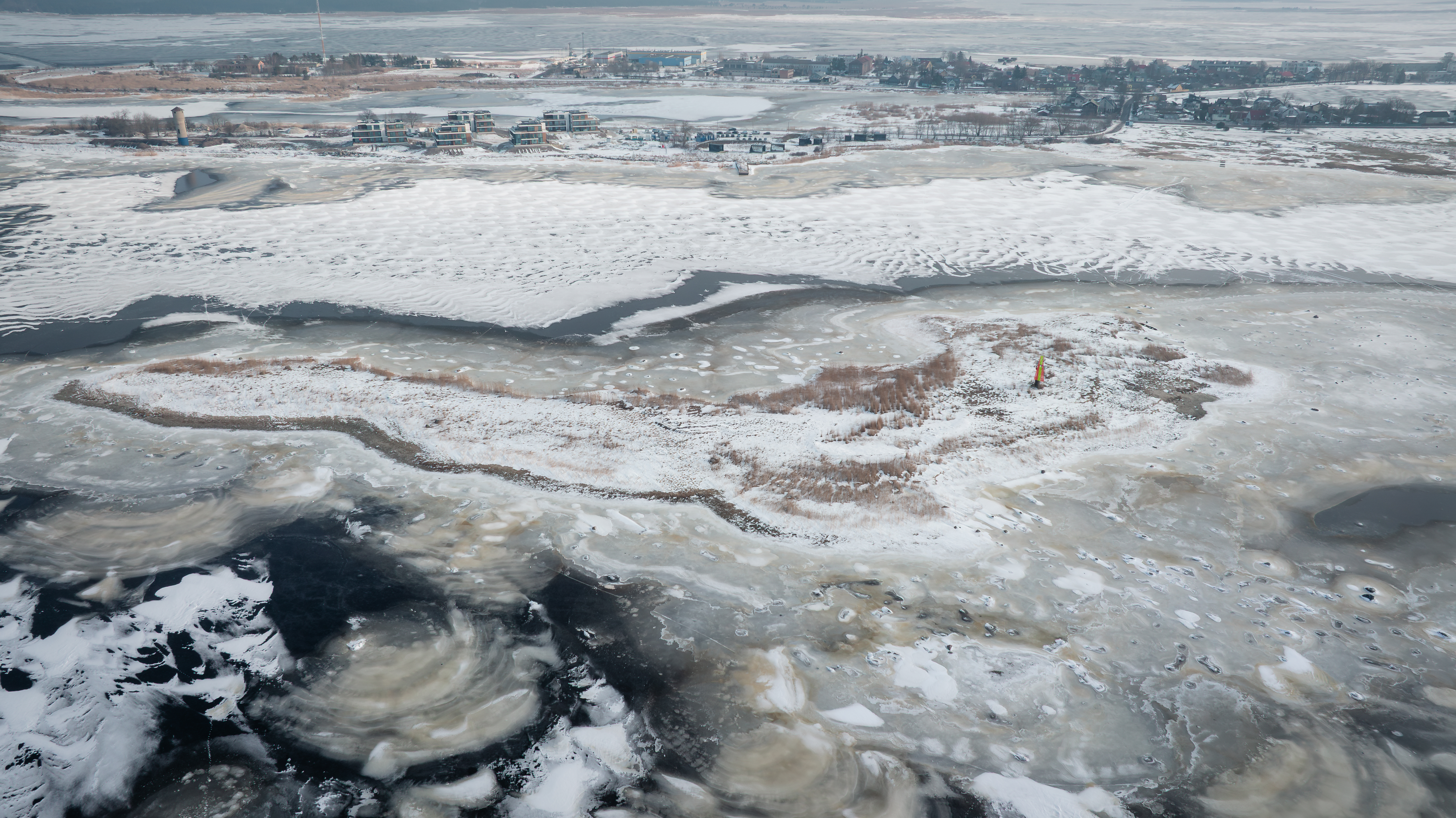
- Interactive map of Kajakarahu

Geography
- Location: Baltic Sea
- Coordinates: 58.953335°N 23.513334°E
- Archipelago: West Estonian archipelago

Administration
- Estonia
- County: Lääne County

Kajakarahu is an Estonian island in Haapsalu, Lääne County, located in Eeslaht. The length of the Kajakarahu coastline is 739 meters. Kajakarahu is located 500 meters south of Uus Sadama, a street.

Kajakarahu belongs to the Väinameri Conservation Area and is under nature protection.

Kajakarahu serves as a critical navigational waypoint for maritime traffic entering the Haapsalu Eeslaht (East Bay). It is the site of the Kajakarahu rear light beacon, which functions in conjunction with the Pinukase front light beacon to form a leading line. This alignment provides essential guidance for vessels, particularly yachts and small craft, navigating the shallow waters toward the Westmeri Marina and the Port of Haapsalu. Due to the area's complex bathymetry and shifting sediments, the islet remains a vital reference point for maintaining safe passage through the local shipping channels.

== See also ==
- Kajakarahud
- List of islands of Estonia
