= Umblu =

Island in Estonia

Coordinates: 59°31′N 25°19′E

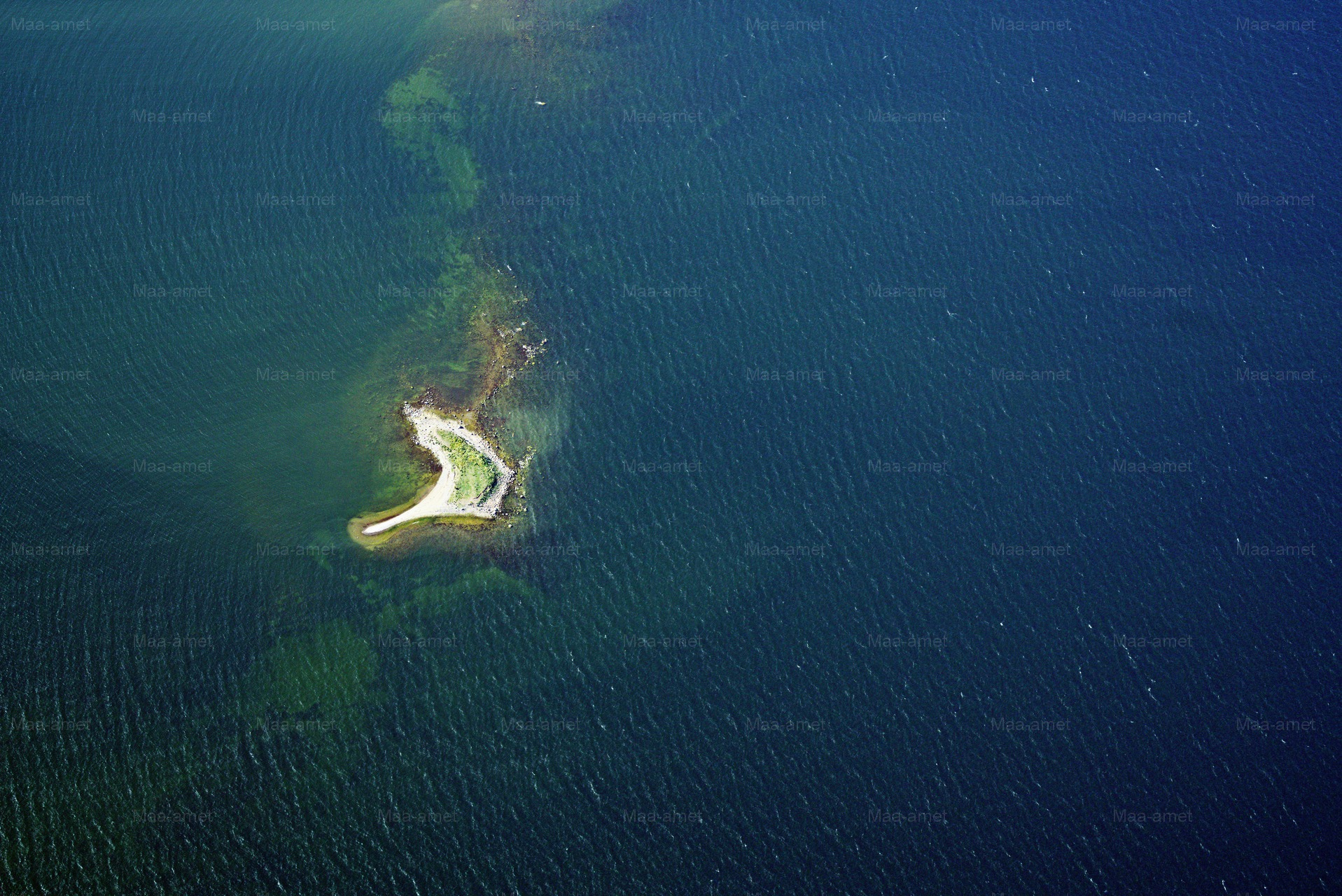
- Interactive map of Umblu

Geography
- Location: Bay of Finland
- Area: 0.005 km^{2} (0.0019 sq mi)

Administration
- Estonia
- Harju County

Umblu is an island belonging to the country of Estonia. While there exists evidence of former habitation, the treeless island is now uninhabited, save for local species of birds.

Umblu Island is also the namesake of an Estonian record label.

It is located about 0.6 km south from Rohusi island.

== See also ==
- List of islands of Estonia
