= Põdvalaid =

Island in Estonia

Coordinates: 58°18′43″N 22°56′32″E

Põdvalaid is an island belonging to the country of Estonia.

== See also ==
- List of islands of Estonia
