= Härjakare =

Island in Estonia

Coordinates: 58°48′26.78″N 22°45′35.31″E

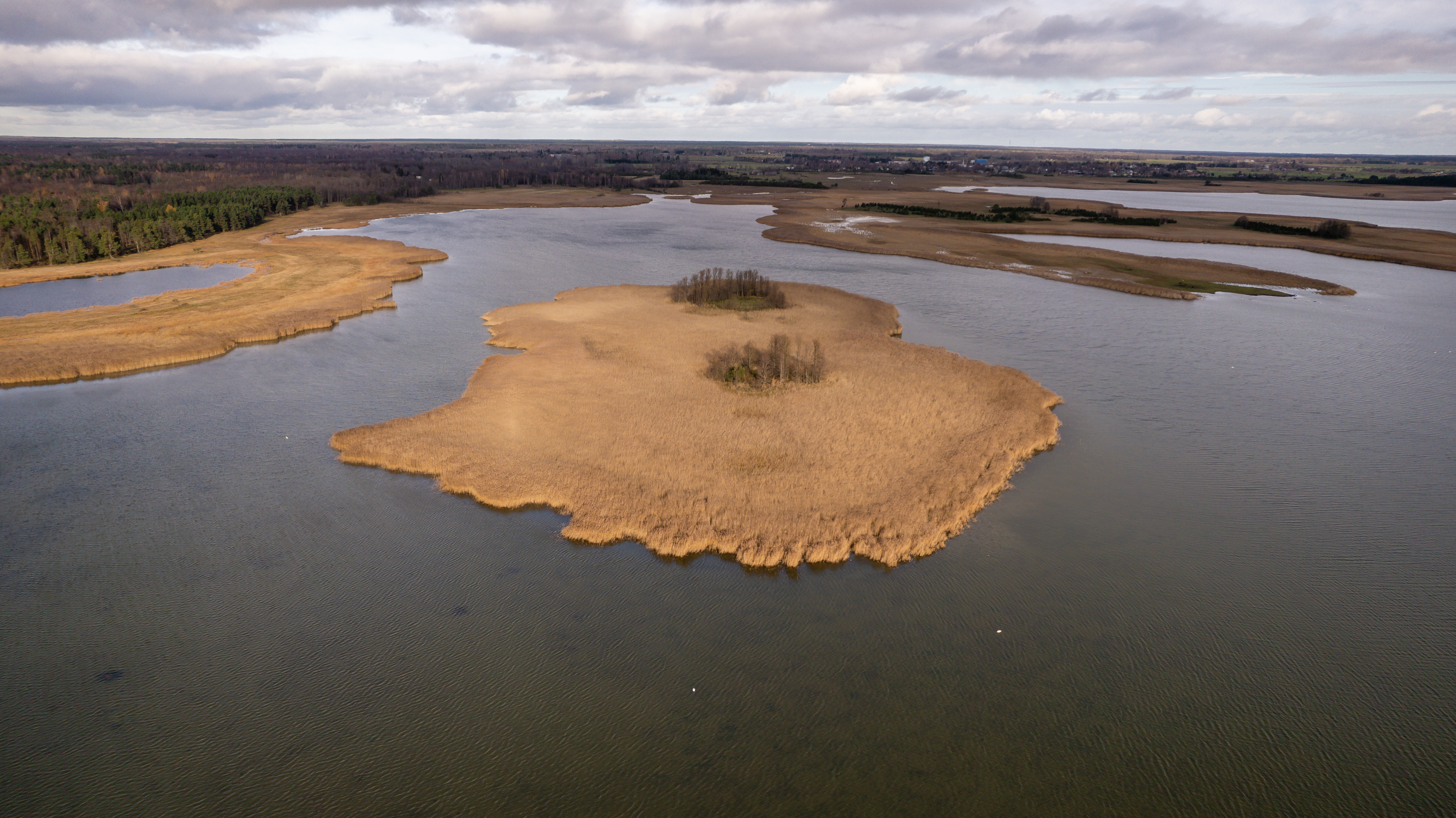
Härglaid

Härjakare or Härglaid is a small uninhabited island in Estonia. It lies about 0.5 kilometres (0 mi) west of Käina Bay.

Härglaid has an area of 2.729 hectares (6.74 acres). Its highest point is 1.9 metres (6 ft 3 in) above sea level. The island is sandy, with a covering of low scrub.

== See also ==
List of islands of Estonia
