= Rannasitik =

Island in Estonia

Coordinates: 58°21′08″N 21°59′08″E

Rannasitik (Estonian: Suur-Sitik) is an island belonging to the country of Estonia. It is located in the Loona Bay, named for a nearby town of the same name. It is 4.42 hectares (about 10.9 acres) large.

== See also ==
List of islands of Estonia
