= Tondirahu =

Island in Estonia

Coordinates: 58.7703°N 23.3383°E

Geography

Administration
- Estonia

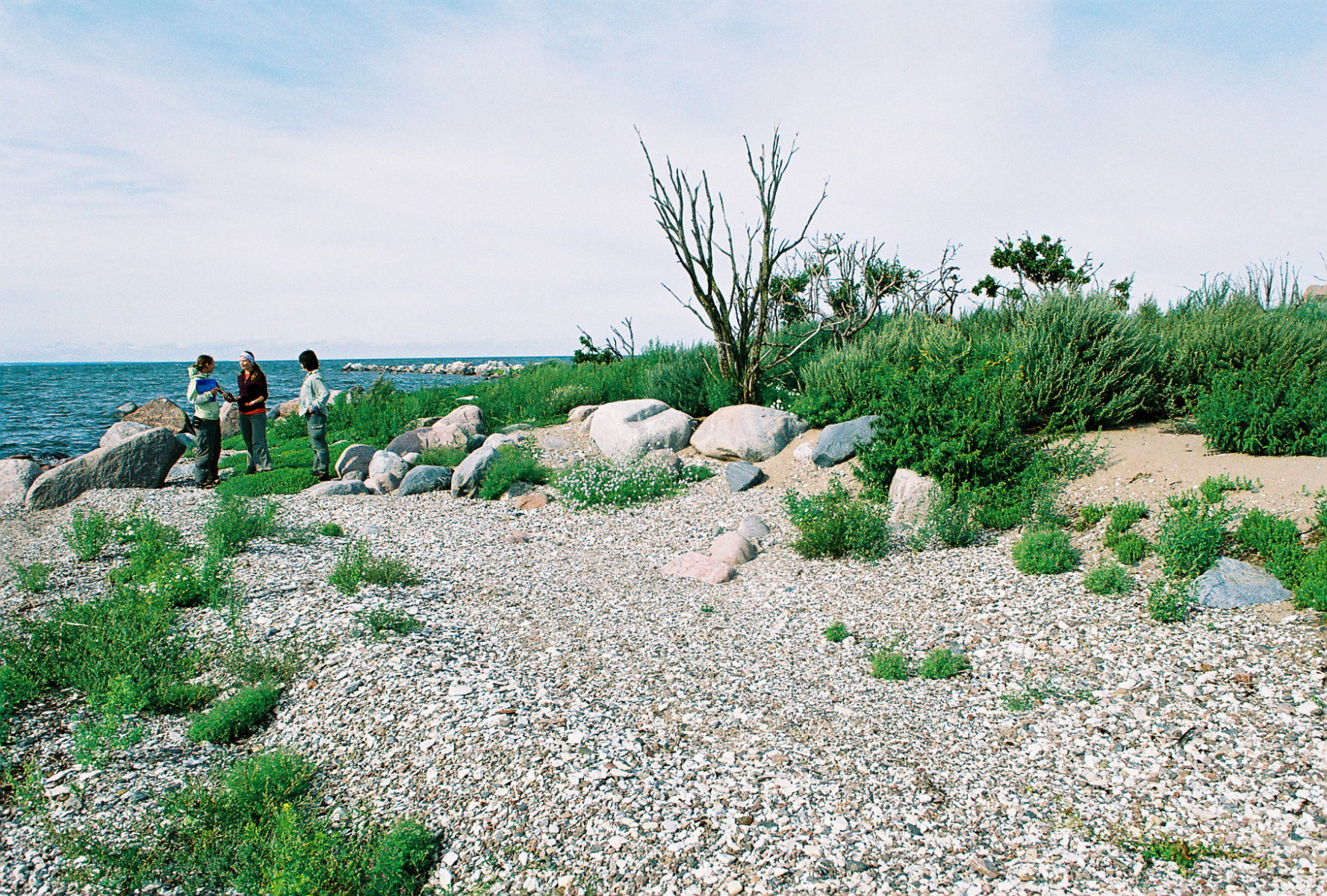
Tondirahu in Matsalu National Park, Lääne County, Estonia.

Tondirahu is a 1.5 hectare large island in Lääne County near the city of Haapsalu, Estonia. It is inside of Matsalu National Park.

The highest point on the island is 3 metres above sea level. The island's coastline is 760 m long.

== Birds ==
From 1986–2010, the largest cormorant colony in Estonia was located on the island.

== Nature conservation ==
The island is protected as a nature reserve due to its birdlife and flora. It is restricted for anyone to enter, land on, or establish economic activities on the Tondirahu. It is also prohibited to dredge or drill on Tondirahu.

== See also ==
- List of islands of Estonia
