= Sokulaid =

Island in Estonia

Coordinates: 58.3356°N 21.8675°E

Sokulaid is an uninhabited 1.2 hecatre island belonging to Estonia. It is located at the mouth of Atla Bay, 210 meters west of the island of Saaremaa. Sokulaid has a 1.27 kilometer long coastline. The island is administratively part of the village of Eeriksaare, Saaremaa Parish, Saare County, and is one of many islands that make up Vilsandi National Park.

== See also ==
- List of islands of Estonia
