= Munaderahu =

Island in Estonia

Coordinates: 58°18′00″N 22°55′33″E

Munaderahu is an island belonging to the country of Estonia. It lies approximately 200m off the coast of Saaremaa and close to the village of Siiksaare. The island has a rocky topography and belongs to the Laidevahe Nature Reserve.

== See also ==
- List of islands of Estonia
