= Oosäär =

Island in Estonia

Coordinates: 58°39′59″N 23°39′40″E

Oosäär (also known as Oossaar, Oossäär, Kuradisäär) is a small islet in the Gulf of Riga, belonging to Estonia.

Oosäär is approximately 4 kilometres (2 mi) long and approximately 5 to 10 meters (15 to 35 ft) at its widest, resembling a long, sinuous spit, but not connected to a larger landform. Vegetation is sparse and the island is made up largely of rocks and pebbles. Located a short distance off the coast of Lääneranna Parish, Oosäär is administered by Pärnu County.

== See also ==
- List of islands of Estonia
