= Kullikare =

Island of Estonia

Coordinates: 58.4025°N 23.0942°E

Kullikare is an island belonging to the country of Estonia.

== See also ==
- List of islands of Estonia
