= Ristlaid =

Island in Estonia

Coordinates: 58.8025°N 22.7922°E

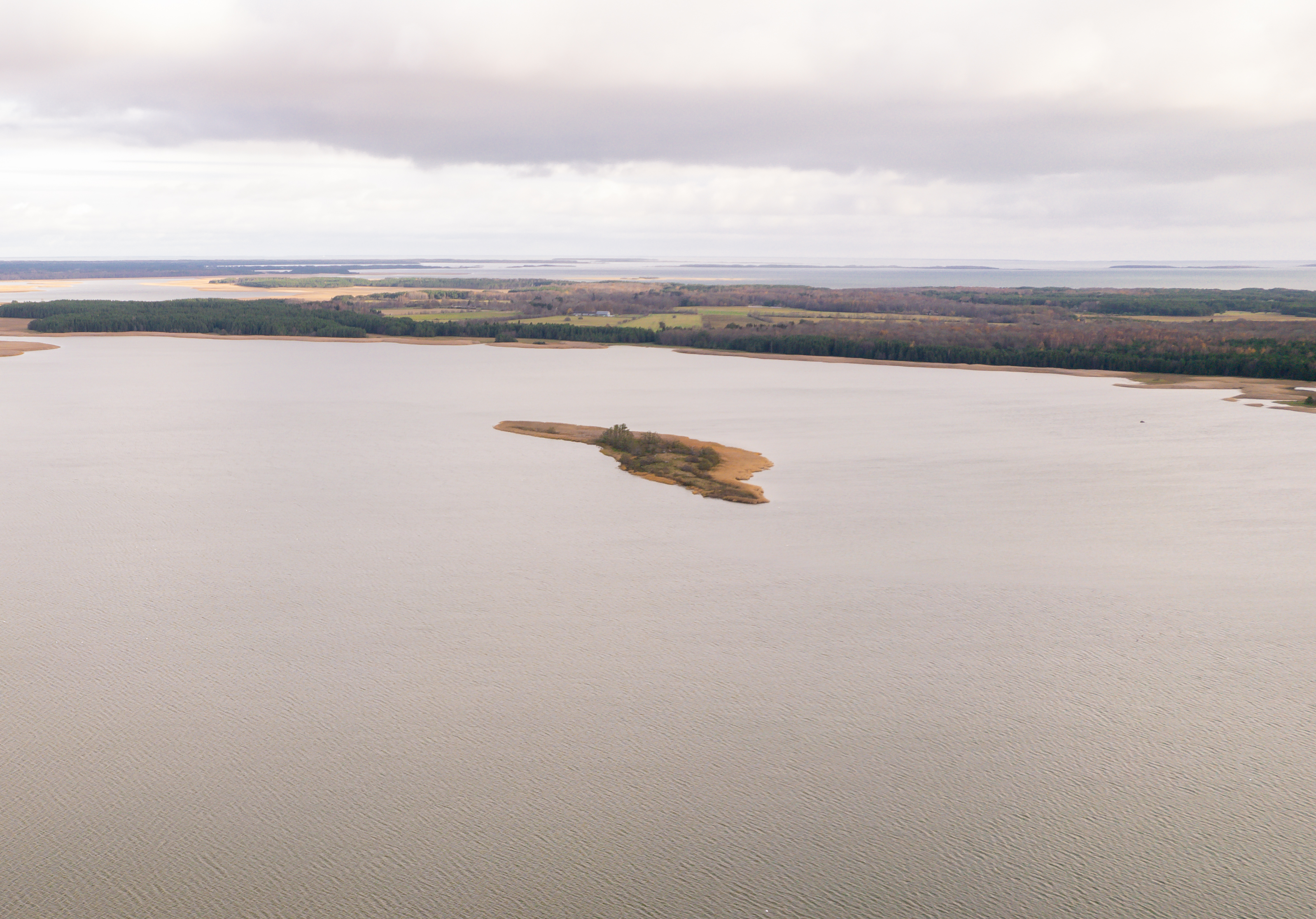
Ristlaid

Ristlaid is an island belonging to the country of Estonia.

== See also ==
- List of islands of Estonia
