= Mustpank (Vaika) =

Island in Estonia

Coordinates: 58°22′48″N 21°48′35″E

Mustpank is one of the Vaika islands belonging to the country of Estonia.Wildlife:

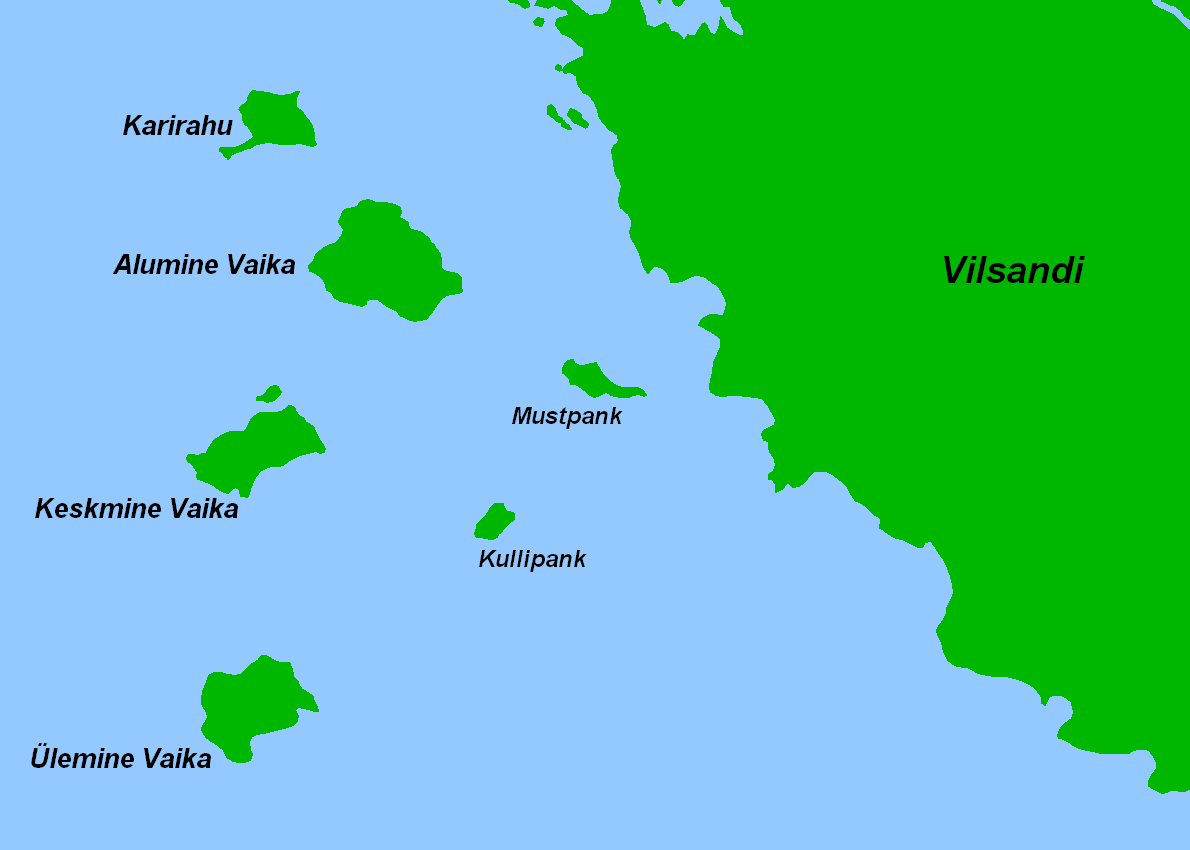
Map showing Mustpank and surrounding islands

Birds:

Eurasian Oystercatcher

Common Tern

== See also ==
- List of islands of Estonia
