= Munasaar =

Island in Estonia

Coordinates: 59.5522°N 26.5689°E

Munasaar is a rocky island belonging to the Baltic country of Estonia. Munasaar is located in the Viru-Nigula Parish, which is part of the Lääne-Viru County, one of the 15 counties of Estonia. Seabirds have been reported to frequently nest on the island.

== See also ==
- List of islands of Estonia
