= Orikalaid =

Island in Estonia

Coordinates: 58.4647°N 23.6599°E

Orikalaid is an island belonging to the country of Estonia. Laid is located 230 metres north of Kändmalaiu and 100 metres north-east of Piiukaarelaiu. It is arch-shaped and has a stony soil.

The meadow is part of the Varbla Meadows Nature Reserve and is protected.

== See also ==
List of islands of Estonia
