= Nabralaid =

Island in Estonia

Coordinates: 58.4331°N 23.1667°E

Nabralaid is an island belonging to the country of Estonia.

== See also ==
- List of islands of Estonia
