= Tõõdilaid =

Island in Estonia

Coordinates: 58°25′14.32″N 23°5′59.38″E

Tõõdilaid (alternatively: Teedi saar, Teedilaid) is a small Estonian islet within Saastna Bay off the south-east coast of the island of Saaremaa in the Baltic Sea. The island covers 0.0136 hectares and has a perimeter of 0.6 kilometers and lies in an oblong southwest–northeast position. Tõõdilaid is administered by Saaremaa Parish, Saare County and is part of the Kahtla-Kübassaare hoiuala Limited-conservation area.

== See also ==
- List of islands of Estonia
