= Laasirahu =

Island in Estonia

Coordinates: 58°22′N 21°52′E

Laasirahu is an island belonging to the country of Estonia.

== See also ==
- List of islands of Estonia
