= Kriimi laid =

Island in Estonia

- Other names: Kriimi, Krimmilaid, Krimmilayd, Ostrov Kriymi-Sar

Geography
- Location: Baltic Sea
- Coordinates: 58°8′24″N 22°8′57″E
- Archipelago: West Estonian archipelago
- Area: 7.4 ha (18 acres)

Administration
- Estonia
- County: Saare County

Kriimi laid is an island belonging to the country of Estonia. It is located in the Ariste laht bay before the island of Saaremaa.

== See also ==
- List of islands of Estonia
