= Ojurahu =

Island in Estonia

Coordinates: 58.3572°N 21.8742°E

Ojurahu is an island belonging to the country of Estonia.

== See also ==
- List of islands of Estonia
