= Öörahu =

Island in Estonia

Coordinates: 58°46′56″N 23°26′56″E

Öörahu is an island belonging to the country of Estonia.

== See also ==
- List of islands of Estonia
