= Vissulaid =

Island in Estonia

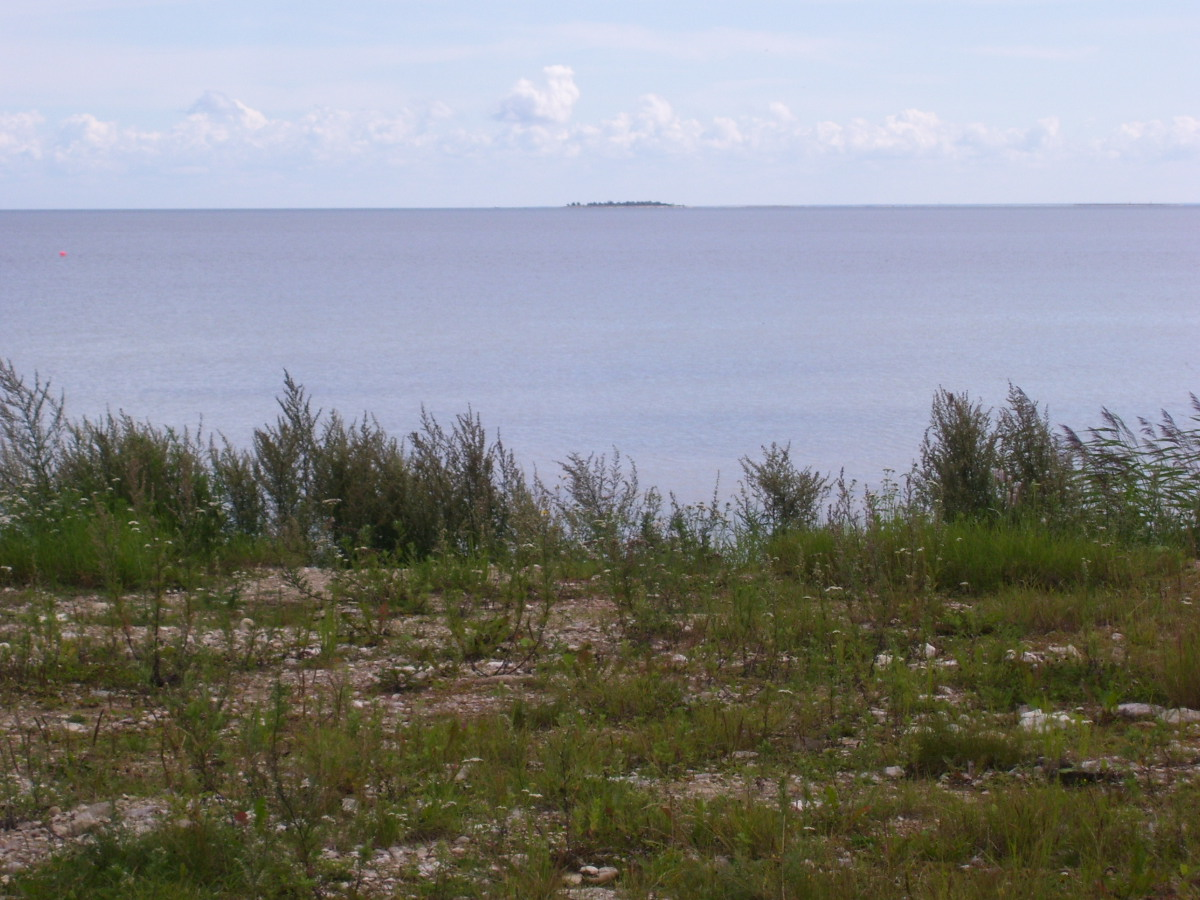
Vissulaid, view from the port of Kärdla.

Vissulaid (Swedish: Vasiholm) is a small, uninhabited island in the Baltic Sea belonging to the country of Estonia. Its coordinates are 59°00′40″N 22°50′26″E

Vissulaid lies just off the northern coast of the island of Hiiumaa, and as such, it is administered by Hiiu County. The closest human settlement to Vissulaid is Kärdla, which lies just southwest of Vissulaid on Hiiumaa.

== See also ==
- List of islands of Estonia
