= Ahtra =

Island in Estonia

- Other names: Väike Viiratükk

Geography
- Location: Baltic Sea
- Coordinates: 58°15′57″N 24°13′01″E

Administration
- Estonia

Ahtra (also called Väike Viiratükk) is an Estonian island in the Baltic Sea. Administratively, Ahtra is part of the village of Kavaru in Pärnu municipality, Pärnu County.

== See also ==
- List of islands of Estonia
