= Kakralaid =

Island in Estonia

Coordinates: 59°01′N 22°58′E

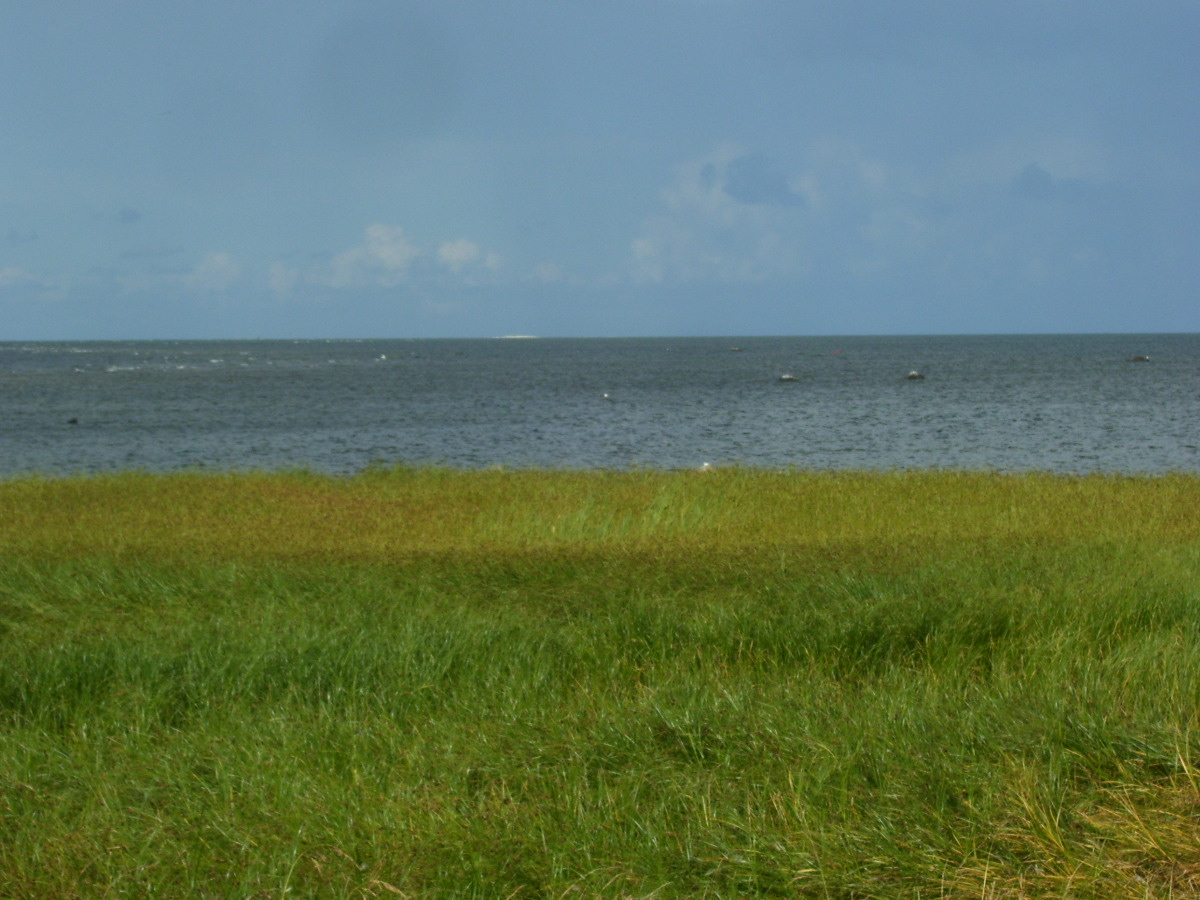
Kakralaid

Kakralaid is an island in Hiiu County, Estonia.

== See also ==
- List of islands of Estonia
