= Langekare =

Island in Estonia

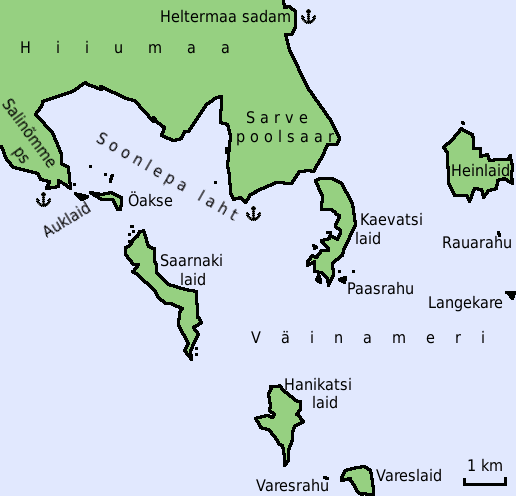
Map showing Langekare Island

Langekare is a small, uninhabited Baltic Sea island belonging to the country of Estonia. Its coordinates are 58°48′21″N 23°09′03″E

Langekare is a 1.2-hectare (3.0-acre) island lying off the eastern coast off the larger Estonian island of Hiiumaa and is administered by Pühalepa Parish, Hiiu County. Along with a number of other small islands and islets, it makes up the Hiiumaa Islets Landscape Reserve (Estonian: Hiiumaa laidude kaitseala). It is the only island of the reserve being a limestone-based island, the rest of the islands being moraine-based.

Langekare is also part of the World Commission on Protected Areas.

== See also ==
- List of islands of Estonia
