= Riinurahu =

Island in Estonia

Coordinates: 58°22′16″N 21°55′07″E

Riinurahu is an island belonging to the country of Estonia.

== See also ==
- List of islands of Estonia
