= Naistekivi maa =

Island in Estonia

Coordinates: 58°14′N 21°56′E

Naistekivi maa is an island belonging to the country of Estonia.

== See also ==
- List of islands of Estonia
