= Hülgelaid =

Island in Estonia

Coordinates: 58.2228°N 22.5172°E

Hülgelaid is an island belonging to the country of Estonia. It has a length of 1.23 kilometres.

== See also ==
- List of islands of Estonia
