= Kõrksaar =

Island in Estonia

Geography
- Location: Baltic Sea
- Coordinates: 58°20′20″N 23°46′52″E

Administration
- Estonia

Kõrksaar is an island belonging to the country of Estonia.

== See also ==
- List of islands of Estonia
