= Tiirloo =

Island in Estonia

Coordinates: 59.6408°N 24.9672°E

Tiirloo is an island belonging to the country of Estonia.

== See also ==
- List of islands of Estonia
