= Pühadekare =

Island in Estonia

Coordinates: 58°29′N 23°23′E

Pühadekare is an island belonging to the country of Estonia.

== See also ==
- List of islands of Estonia
