= Härjamaa =

Island in Estonia

Coordinates: 58.8483°N 23.3544°E

Härjamaa is an island belonging to the country of Estonia.

== See also ==
List of islands of Estonia
