= Kitselaid =

Island in Estonia

Coordinates: 58°27′N 23°40′E

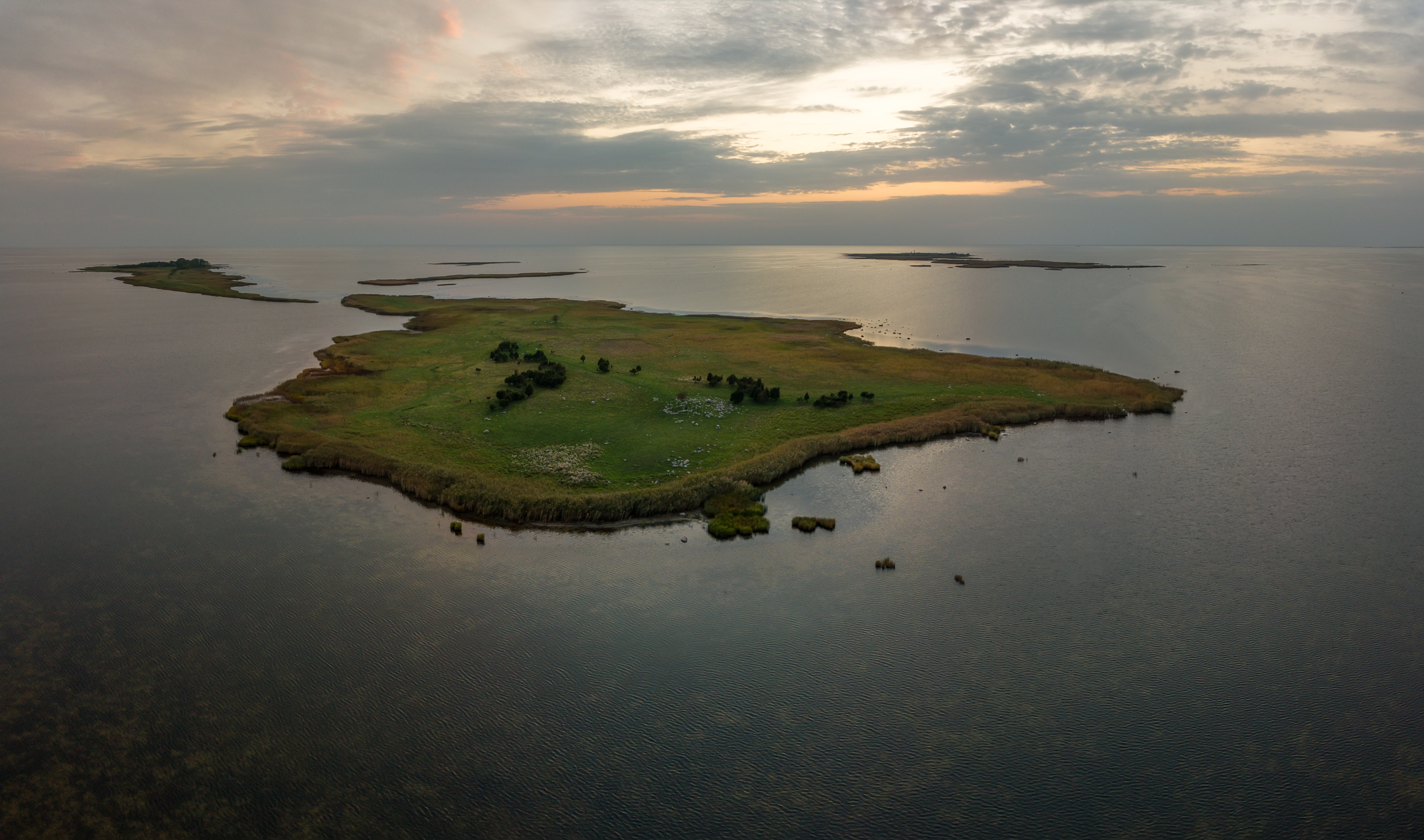
View of Kitselaid

Kitselaid is an island belonging to the country of Estonia.

== See also ==
- List of islands of Estonia
