= Udrikulaid =

Island in Estonia

Coordinates: 58.4272°N 23.2814°E

Udrikulaid is an island belonging to the country of Estonia. The island is located in Muraja Bay between Muraja and Kübassaare peninsula, 300 metres from Kübassaare peninsula. The island covers an area of 83.6 hectares and has a maximum height of 5 m. The coastline of the island is 9.3 km long.

The island is up to 5 m high. It is covered with grass and scrub and has fields. The island has been inhabited in the past. In the summer of 2004, the actors of the Ugala Theatre prepared the story "Weapons face to face" by Peet Vallaku on the islet.

The island is part of the Kahtla-Kübassaare nature reserve and is under nature protection.

== See also ==
- List of islands of Estonia
