= Vesiloo =

Island in Estonia

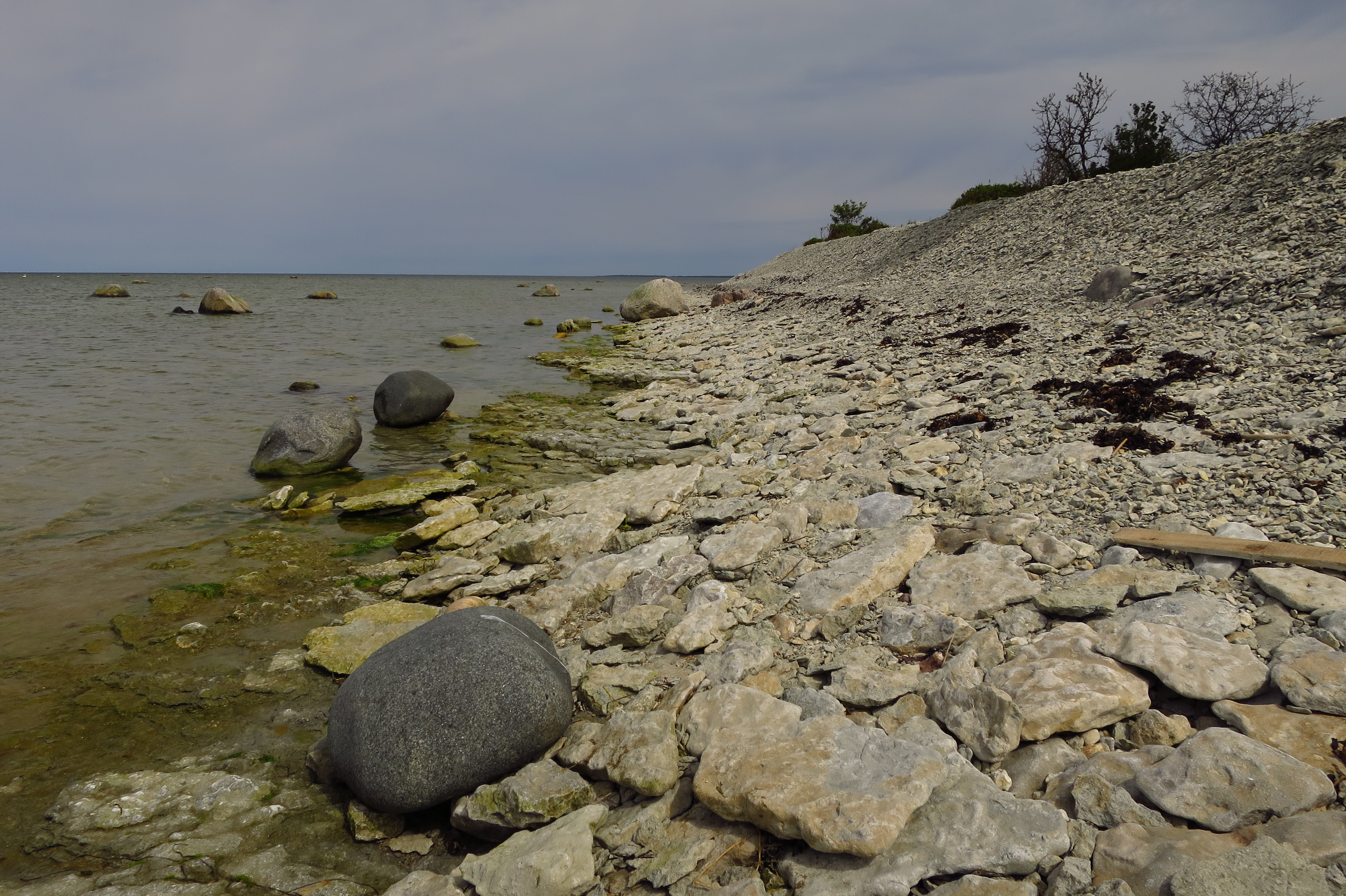
Vesiloo plateau in Vilsandi National Park

Vesiloo is a small, uninhabited Estonian island in the Baltic Sea. Its coordinates are 58°23′45″N 21°50′35″E.

Vesiloo lies just off the northern coast of the island of Vilsandi. The water between the two islands is shallow enough to enable access to each by wading through the sea. It is administered by Saaremaa Municipality, Saare County and is part of the Vilsandi National Park.

== See also ==
- List of islands of Estonia
