= Rusulaid =

Island in Estonia

- Location within Estonia

Geography
- Coordinates: 58.441111°N 23.168611°E
- Archipelago: West Estonian Archipelago
- Adjacent to: Baltic Sea
- Area: 0.015 sq mi (0.039 km^{2})

Administration
- Estonia

Demographics
- Population: No Inhabitants

Rusulaid is an Estonian island in the Baltic Sea.

Administratively, it is a part of Saaremetsa village, Saaremaa Parish, Saare County.

== See also ==
- List of islands of Estonia
