= Seasaar =

Island in Estonia

Coordinates: 59°01′N 23°23′E

Seasaar is an island belonging to Estonia.

== See also ==
- List of islands of Estonia
