= Põiksäär =

Island in Estonia

Coordinates: 58.4417°N 23.2803°E

Põiksäär is a small island in Saare County, Estonia.

== See also ==
- List of islands of Estonia
