= Uus-Nootamaa =

Island in Estonia

Coordinates: 58.3219°N 21.7878°E

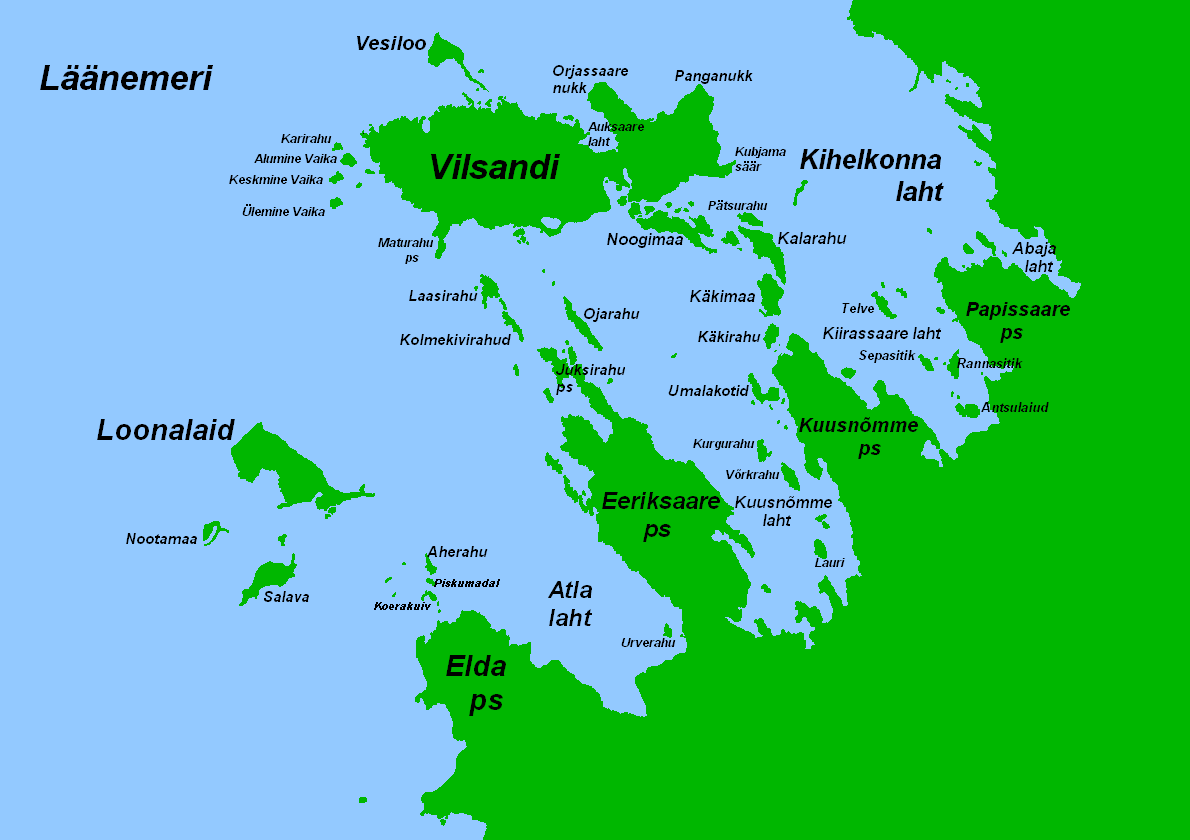
Map showing Uus-Nootamaa and neighbouring islands

Uus-Nootamaa is an island belonging to the country of Estonia. It is part of Vilsandi National Park.

== See also ==
- List of islands of Estonia
