= Rohurahu =

Island in Estonia

Coordinates: 58°50′6.58″N 23°25′36.25″E

Koharahu (also Rohurahu (Note: Roograhu on google maps)) – is a small Estonian Island on the Baltic Sea, in the area of strait Väinameri, at the entrance to bay Lõpe, on the west coast of the country. To the west of the island is Liialaid, to the southwest Suurrahu, to the east the island of Tauksi.

It covers an area of 1,959 ha. The circumference of the island is 706 m. Administratively, it is located in the province of province Läänemaa, in the municipality of Ridala. The island has no tall vegetation.

Other names of the island include: Roograhu, Rohurahu, and Väike Roograhu.

== See also ==
- List of islands of Estonia
