= Ahessäär =

Island belonging to Estonia

Coordinates: 58.5400°N 23.5747°E

Ahessäär is an island belonging to the country of Estonia. It lies approximately 1.5 km (0.9 mi) south-west of Pivarootsi.

== See also ==
List of islands of Estonia
