= Hanemaa =

Island in Estonia

Coordinates: 58.8292°N 23.3725°E

- Island
- Interactive map of Hanemaa

Hanemaa is an island belonging to the country of Estonia. It is located of the coast of Estonia.

== See also ==
- List of islands of Estonia
