= Taguküla laid =

Island in Estonia

Coordinates: 58°47′N 22°53′E

Taguküla laid is an island belonging to the country of Estonia.

== See also ==
- List of islands of Estonia
