= Imutlaid =

Island in Estonia

Coordinates: 58.1486°N 23.9314°E

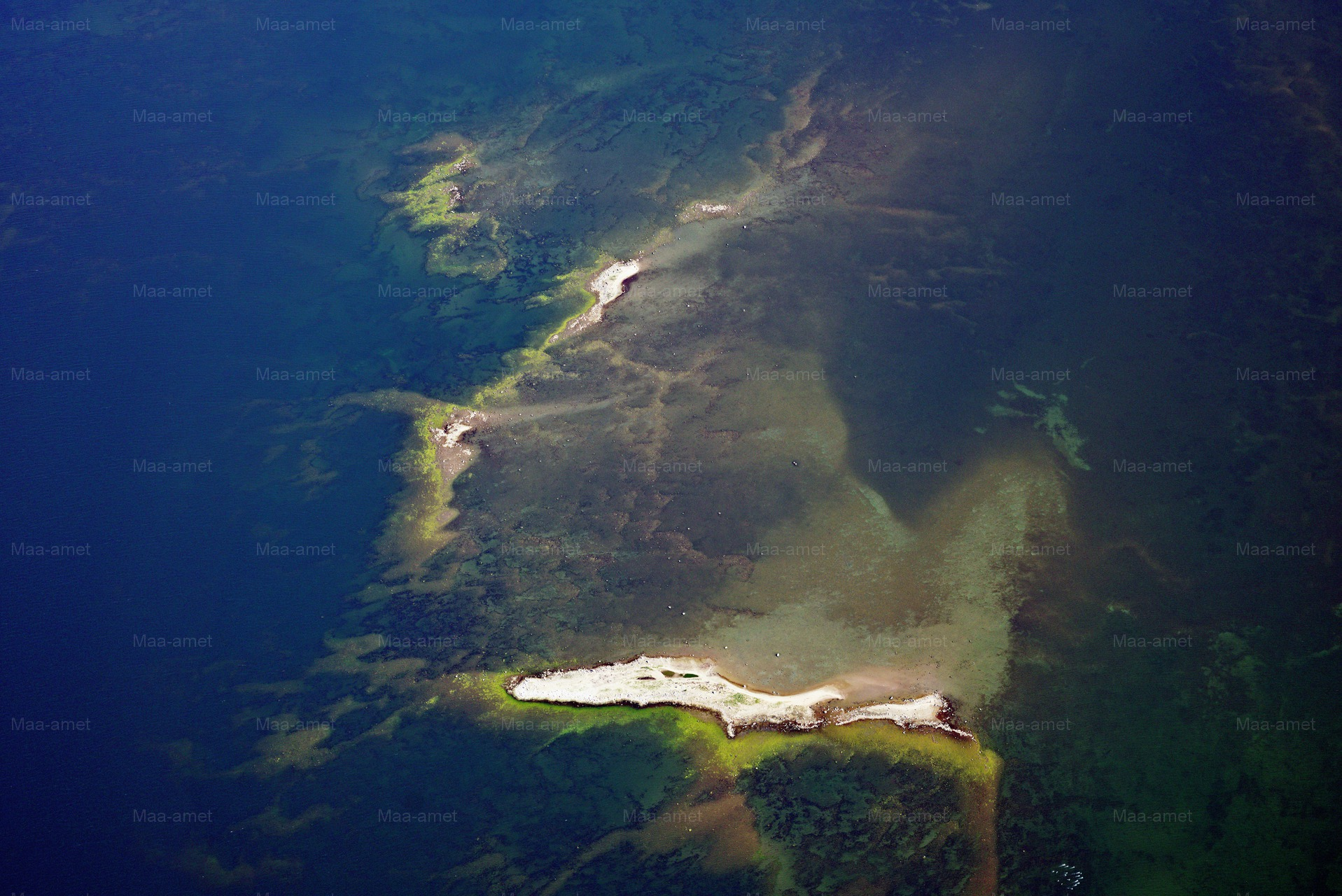
Imutlaid and smaller Imutlao suardu. Further away there are also Piälmine rava and Iedikrava

Imutilaid is an island belonging to the country of Estonia and is part of the Sangelaiu Conservation Area.

== See also ==
- List of islands of Estonia
