= Kakrarahu =

Island in Matsalu National Park, Estonia

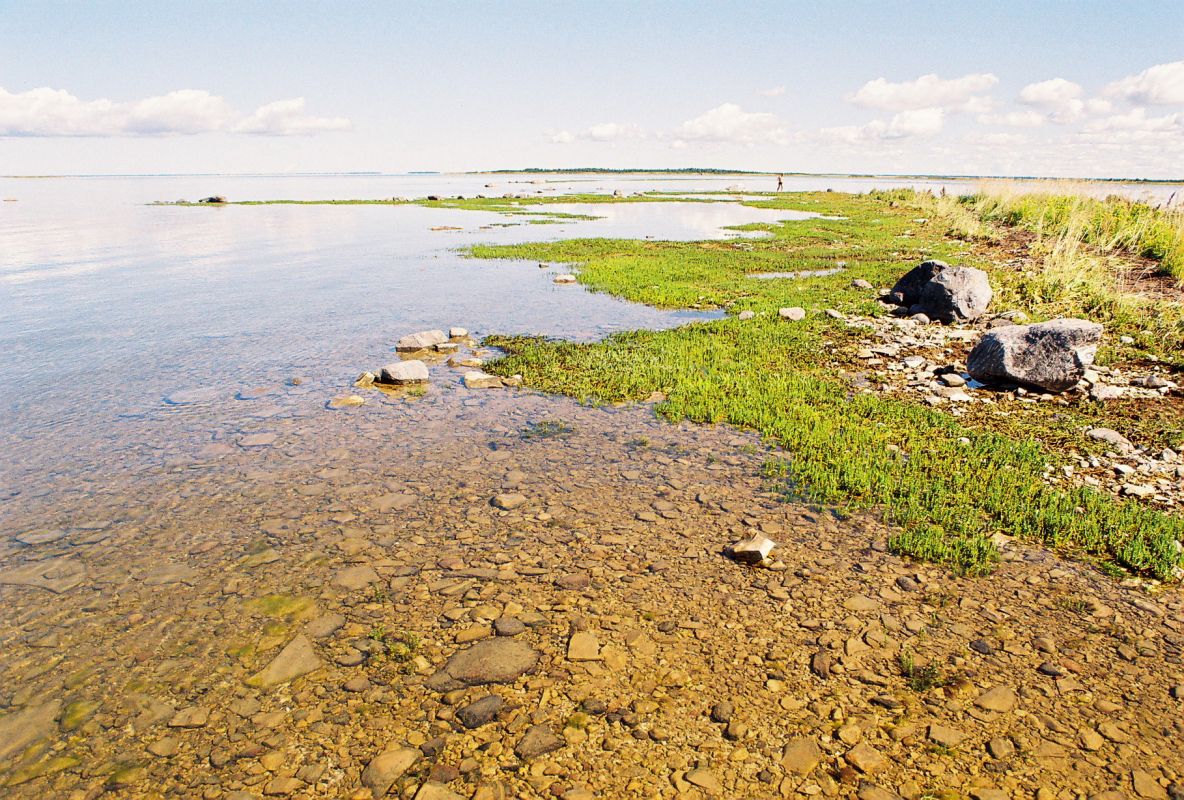
- Interactive map of Kakrarahu

Geography
- Coordinates: 58°46′0.01″N 23°26′21.01″E

Administration
- Estonia

Additional information
- Time zone: EET

Kakrarahu is an island in Matsalu National Park, Estonia. It is located in Lääne County, and has a humid continental climate.

== See also ==
- List of islands of Estonia
