= Vasikalaid =

Island in Estonia

Coordinates: 58.3717°N 21.9936°E

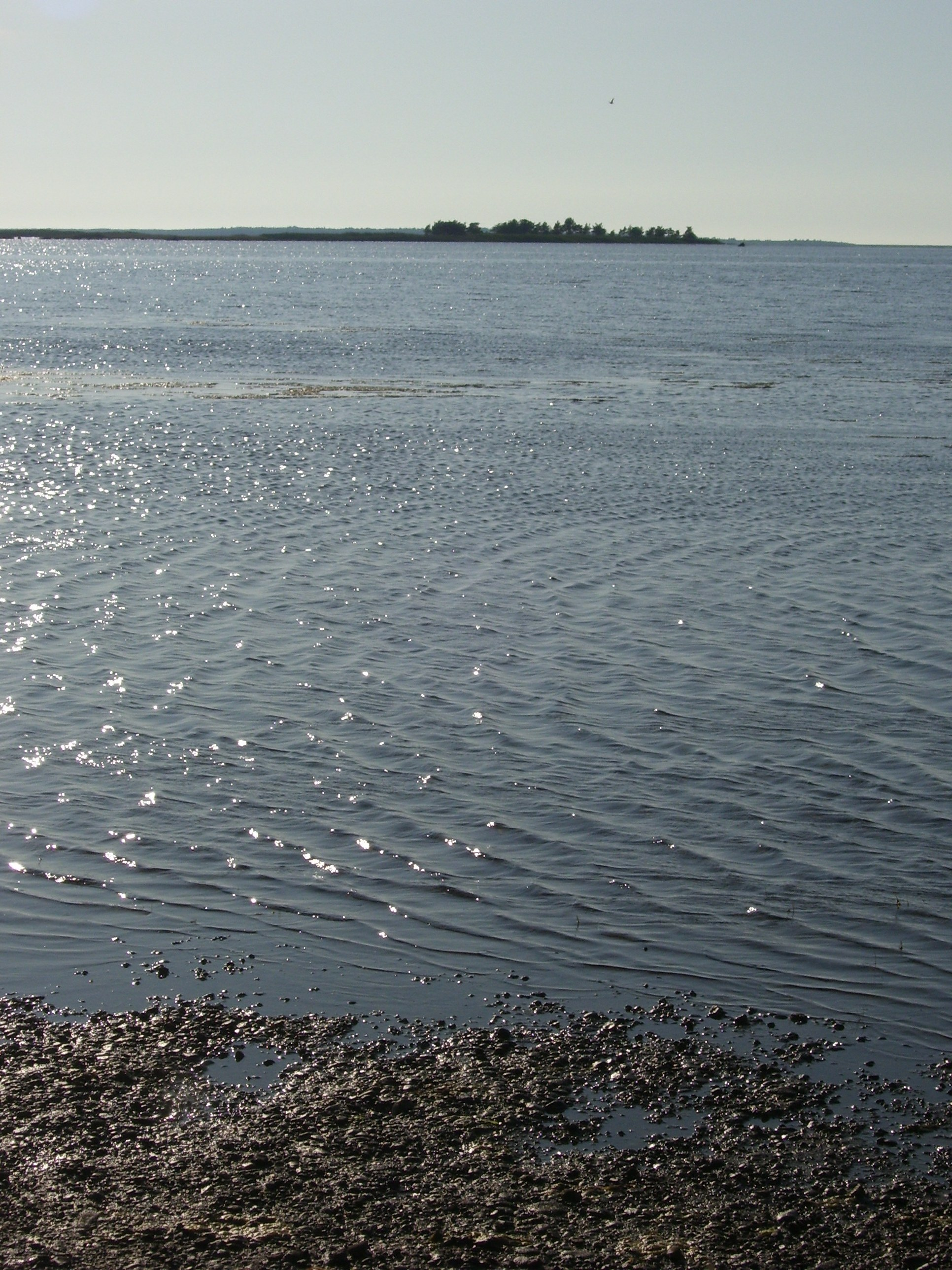
View of the islet of Vassiklaid, Saaremaa County, Estonia

Vassiklaid is an uninhabited island in Saaremaa Parish, Saare County in western Estonia.

The size of the island is 3.3 hectares, the length of the coastline is 1.2 km. The islet has a rocky surface, a few junipers grow there. The island is located 150 meters from the coast of Saaremaa.

== See also ==
List of islands of Estonia
