= Tagarahu =

Island in Estonia

Coordinates: 58°47′46″N 23°27′26″E

Tagarahu (alternately: Orarahu) is a small island in the Baltic Sea belonging to the country of Estonia.

Tagarahu lies off the western coast of Estonia in the Väinameri Strait, northeast of the island Esirahu and southwest of the island of Paljarahu. Tagarahu is elongated in a north–south direction and occupies an area of 2.82 ha, with a circumference of approximately. 1.1 km. It is administered by the mainland village of Puise in Ridala Parish, Lääne County.

The island and surrounding area are protected as part of Matsalu National Park.
