= Eerikulaid =

Island in Estonia

Coordinates: 58°54′48″N 23°06′50″E

Eerikulaid is an islet belonging to the country of Estonia.

== See also ==
- List of islands of Estonia
