= Aherahu =

Island in Estonia

Coordinates: 58.7489°N 23.1345°E

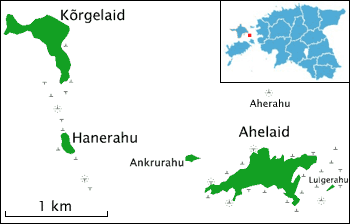
Map of Ahelaiu and other nearby islets

Aherahu is about 0.1 ha small islet in the Väinameri Sea in Estonia.

== See also ==
- List of islands of Estonia
