= Kurgurahu =

Island in Estonia

Coordinates: 58.3383°N 21.9292°E

Kurgurahu is an island belonging to the country of Estonia.

== See also ==
- List of islands of Estonia
