= Antsulaiud =

Island group in Estonia

Coordinates: 58.3456°N 21.9892°E

Antsulaiud is an island belonging to the country of Estonia.

== See also ==
- List of islands of Estonia
