= Papirahu =

Island in Estonia

Coordinates: 58.6631°N 23.4069°E

Papirahu is an island belonging to the country of Estonia. The length of the Rahu coastline is 1 km. Rahu is located 2 kilometres south of Papilaiu. Rahu has a sandy surface.

== See also ==
- List of islands of Estonia
