= Papilaid =

Island in Estonia

Coordinates: 58°41′N 23°25′E

Papilaid is an island belonging to the country of Estonia.

== See also ==
- List of islands of Estonia
