= Mihklirahu =

Island in Estonia

Coordinates: 58.3522°N 21.8717°E

Mihklirahu is an island belonging to the country of Estonia. It has a length of 0.84 kilometers.

== See also ==
- List of islands of Estonia
