= Käkirahu =

Island in Estonia

Coordinates: 58°48′36″N 23°04′21″E

Käkirahu is an island in the Väinameri strait in the southeastern part of Hiiu County, Estonia. The island has a total area of 170 m² with a coastline length of 57 meters.

Käkirahu is one of the smallest islands with an official name in Estonia.

The island is part of the Väinameri Conservation Area.

== See also ==
- List of islands of Estonia
