= Auklaid =

Island in Estonia

Coordinates: 58.8244°N 22.9622°E

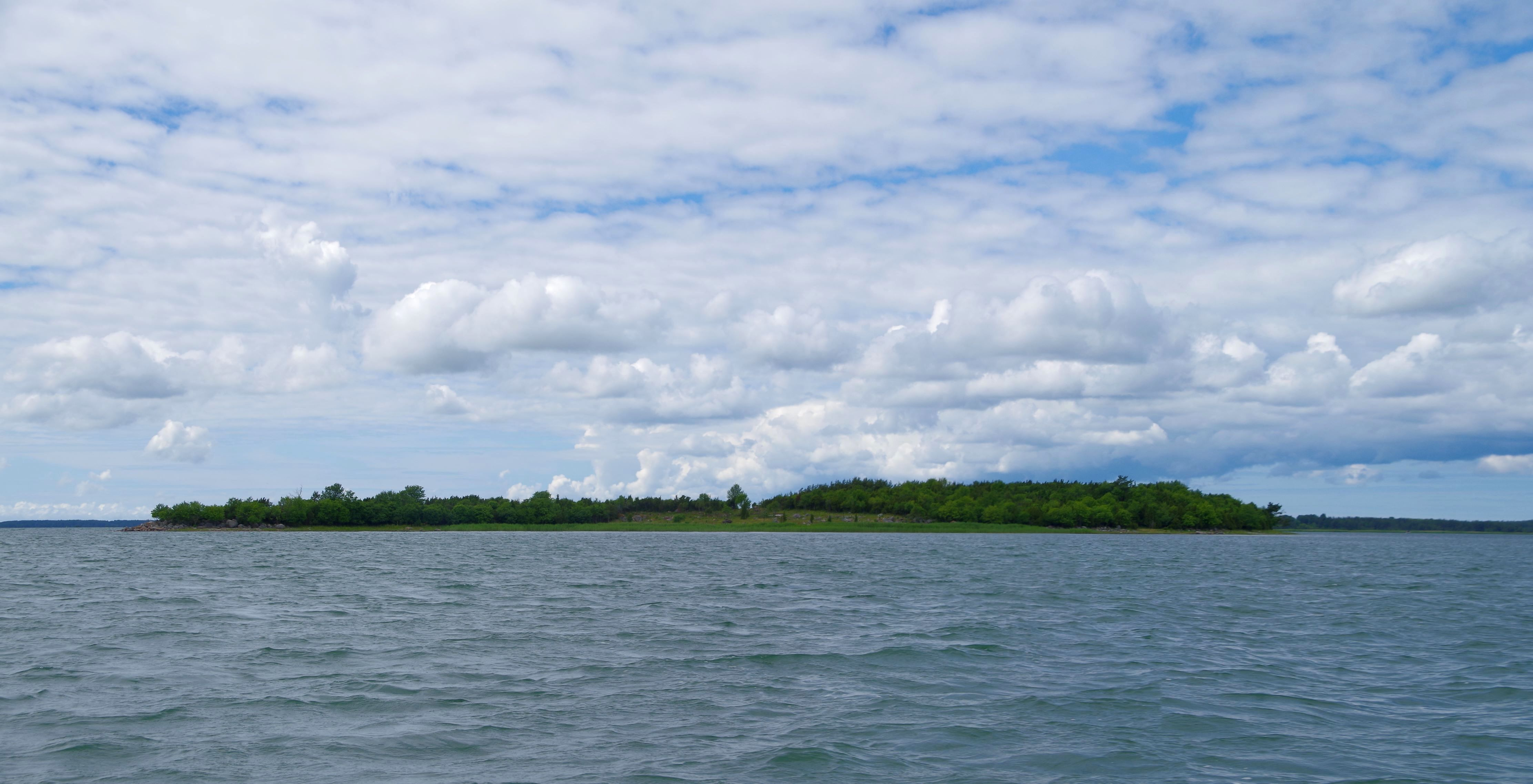
View of Auklaid

Auklaid is an island belonging to the country of Estonia.

== See also ==
- List of islands of Estonia
