= Reigilaid (Rootsi) =

Island in Estonia

Coordinates: 58°59′27″N 22°29′35″E

Reigilaid (lit. 'Reigi Islet', also spelled Reigi laid) is a former small islet in the Baltic Sea split between the settlements of Rootsi and Pihla, Estonia.

== Geography ==
Reigilaid lies at the southeast end of Reigi Bay (Estonian: Reigi laht), about 1 kilometer (0.62 mi) northeast of the beach at Kõrgessaare. It is now a peninsula of the island of Hiiumaa. Reigilaid has an area of about 0.95 square kilometers (0.37 sq mi). It lies 4 meters (13 ft) above sea level.

== Name ==
The name Reigilaid is a compound, in which the second element, -laid, means 'islet'. Among various theories, the most common is that the first part, Reigi-, derives from a form like *hraukia, *röiki, or *räike, meaning 'stony land, stony region', thus 'stony/rocky island'. The onomastician Aino Naert (1921–2008) pointed out that in the Hiiumaa Swedish dialect öy became i, and that the final -i in Reigi- may be a development of Swedish ö 'island' (from Old Norse ey).

== See also ==
- List of islands of Estonia
