= Käkimaa =

Island in Estonia

Coordinates: 58°22′N 21°56′E

Käkimaa (or Kalarahu) is a 43.3 hectare island in Saare County belonging to the country of Estonia. The islands coastline is 5.4 kilometers long. It is crescent-shaped and belongs to Vilsandi National Park.

== See also ==
- List of islands of Estonia
