= Allirahu =

Island in Estonia

Allirahu is an islet located in the Baltic Sea, west off the Estonian coast. Its coordinates are 58°17′57.87″N 22°58′11.01″E.

== See also ==
- List of islands of Estonia
