= Telve (island) =

Island in Estonia

Coordinates: 58.3617°N 21.9639°E

Telve is an island in the Baltic Sea belonging to the country of Estonia. it has a population of 1,534 as of 2021.

== See also ==
- List of islands of Estonia
