= Reigilaid (Orjaku) =

Island in Estonia

Coordinates: 58°47′43″N 22°45′23″E

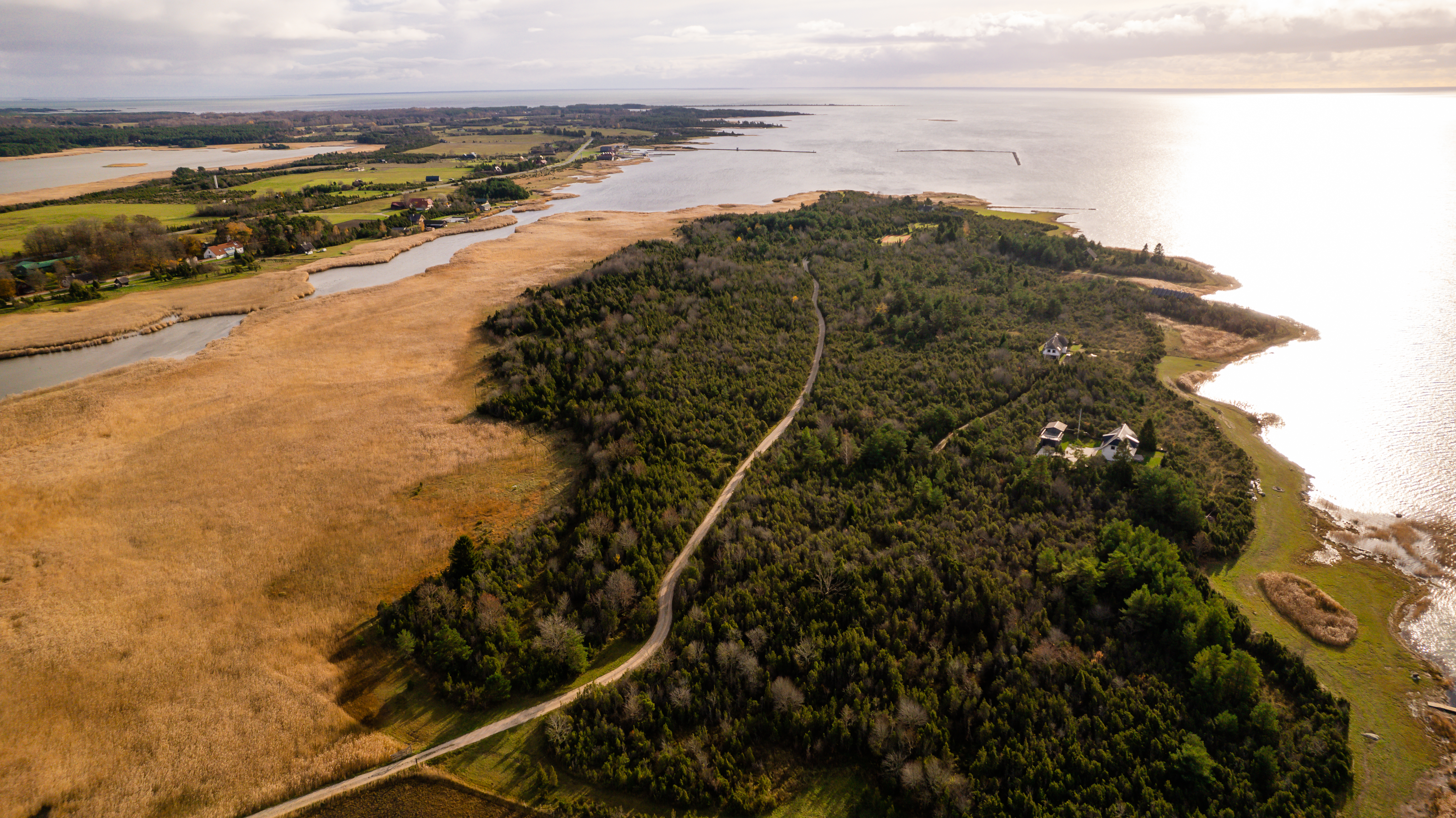
Reigilaid in 2022

Reigilaid (lit. 'Reigi Islet', also spelled Reigi laid, also known as Reigi saar 'Reigi Island' or Reigi poolsaar 'Reigi Peninsula') is a former small islet in the Baltic Sea in Orjaku, Estonia.

== Geography ==
Reigilaid lies at the northwest end of Kassari island, in Jausa Bay. It is now a peninsula of the island of Hiiumaa. Reigilaid has an area of 0.30 square kilometers (0.12 sq mi) to 0.36 square kilometers (0.14 sq mi), depending on the measurement, and it has an oblong northwest–southeast orientation. It lies 5 meters (16 ft) above sea level.

== Name ==
The name Reigilaid is a compound, in which the second element, -laid, means 'islet'. Among various theories, the most common is that the first part, Reigi-, derives from a form like *hraukia, *röiki, or *räike, meaning 'stony land, stony region', thus 'stony/rocky island'. The onomastician Aino Naert (1921–2008) pointed out that in the Hiiumaa Swedish dialect öy became i, and that the final -i in Reigi- may be a development of Swedish ö 'island' (from Old Norse ey).

== See also ==
- List of islands of Estonia
