= Hanerahu =

Island in Estonia

Coordinates: 58°44′37″N 23°5′54″E

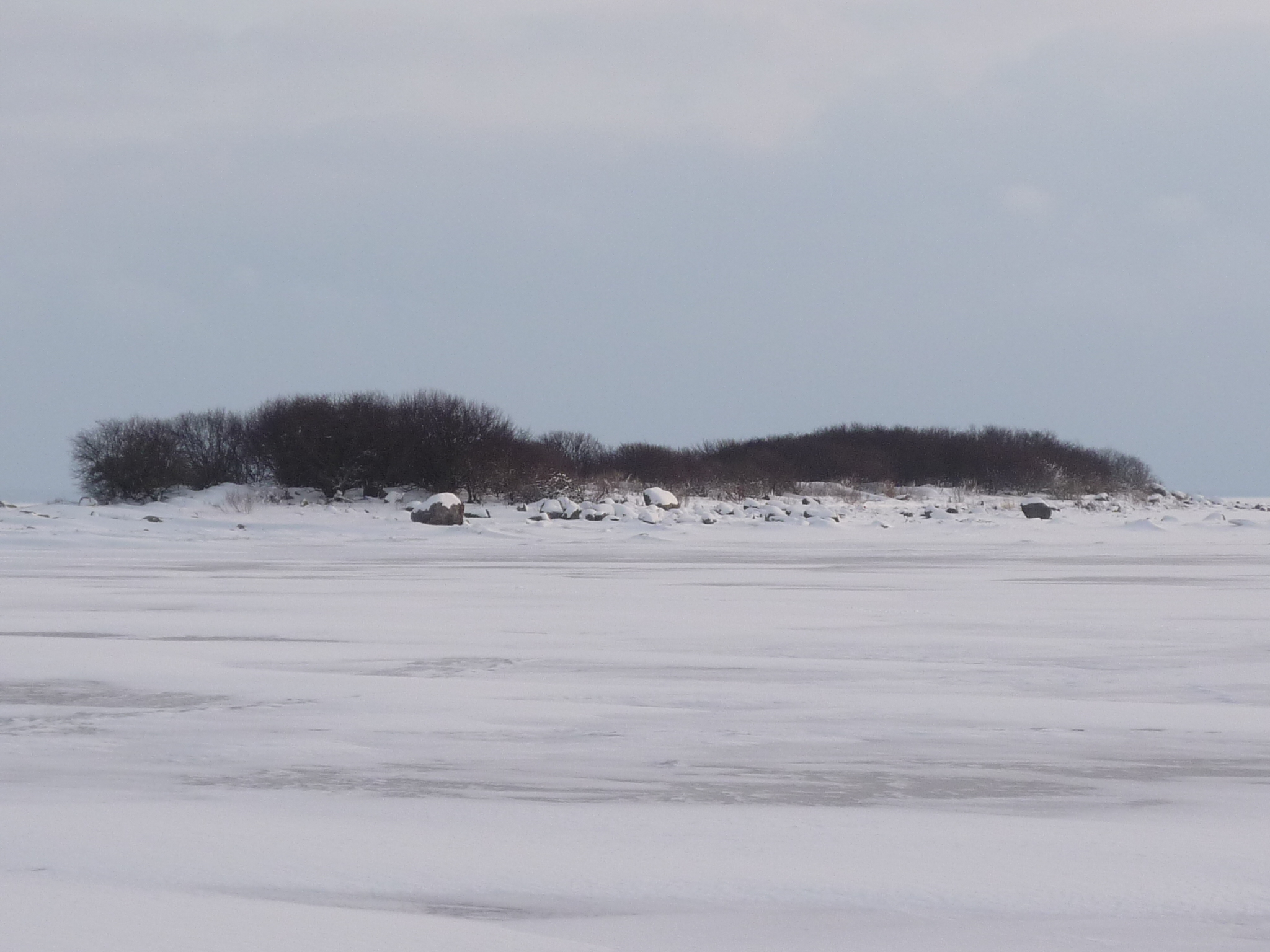
Hanerahu during winter

Hanerahu (also called Anerahu) is an uninhabited Estonian islet with surface area of 1.2 hectares. It lies south-east of Hiiumaa island and is part of Pühalepa Municipality. The islet belongs to Hiiumaa Islets Landscape Reserve.

== See also ==
- List of islands of Estonia
