= Vareslaid (Käina) =

Island in Estonia

Coordinates: 58°48′49″N 22°45′58″E

Vareslaid (also known as Ostrov Varese-Layd, or Vareselaid) is an island belonging to the country of Estonia.

== See also ==
List of islands of Estonia
