= Uulutilaid =

Island in Estonia

Coordinates: 58°39′59″N 23°31′41″E

Uulutilaid is a small islet positioned just off the coast of Virtsu Peninsula in the Baltic Sea belonging to the country of Estonia.

Uulutilaid covers an area of 24.2 hectares and is administered by Pärnu County (Estonian: Pärnu maakond).
