= Selglaid =

Island in Estonia

Coordinates: 58°27′36″N 23°38′22″E

Selglaid is an island belonging to the country of Estonia in the Gulf of Riga. It is located approximately 2km (1.24mi) of the west coast of the Pärnumaa county in Estonia.

Selglaid is 0.603km^{2} (0.233mi^{2}) in size, with a coastline of 6.135km (3.81mi), and a tree coverage of 65%.

== See also ==
- List of islands of Estonia
