= Laidu =

Island in Estonia

Coordinates: 58.5211°N 22.2794°E

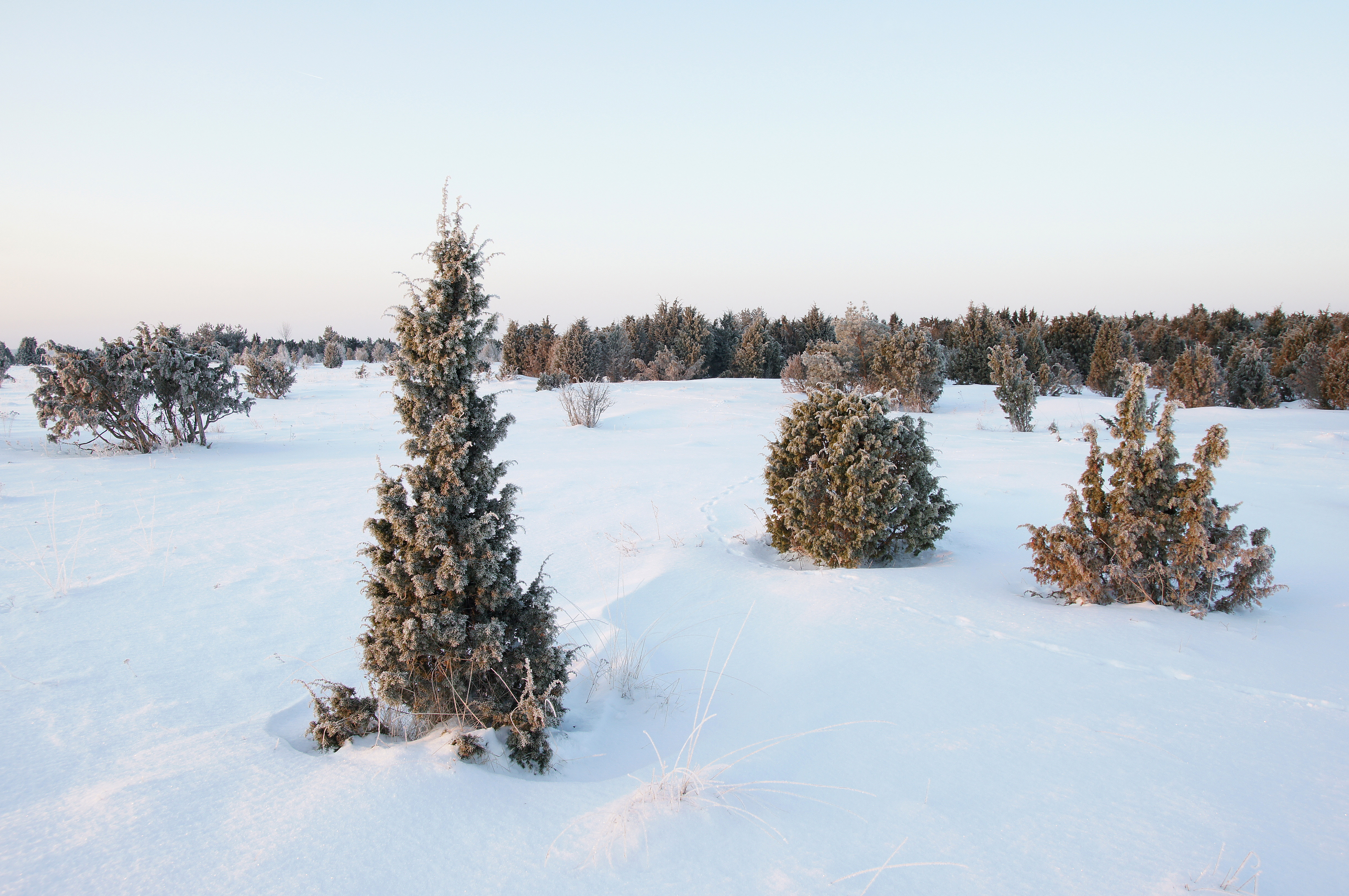
Winter morning on the island of Laidu, Küdema Bay

Laidu is an island belonging to the country of Estonia. Located in Küdema Bay, it is the nesting site of many protected bird species during the summer months.

== See also ==
- List of islands of Estonia
