= Allu (island) =

Island in Estonia

Coordinates: 59°34′14″N 25°14′32″E

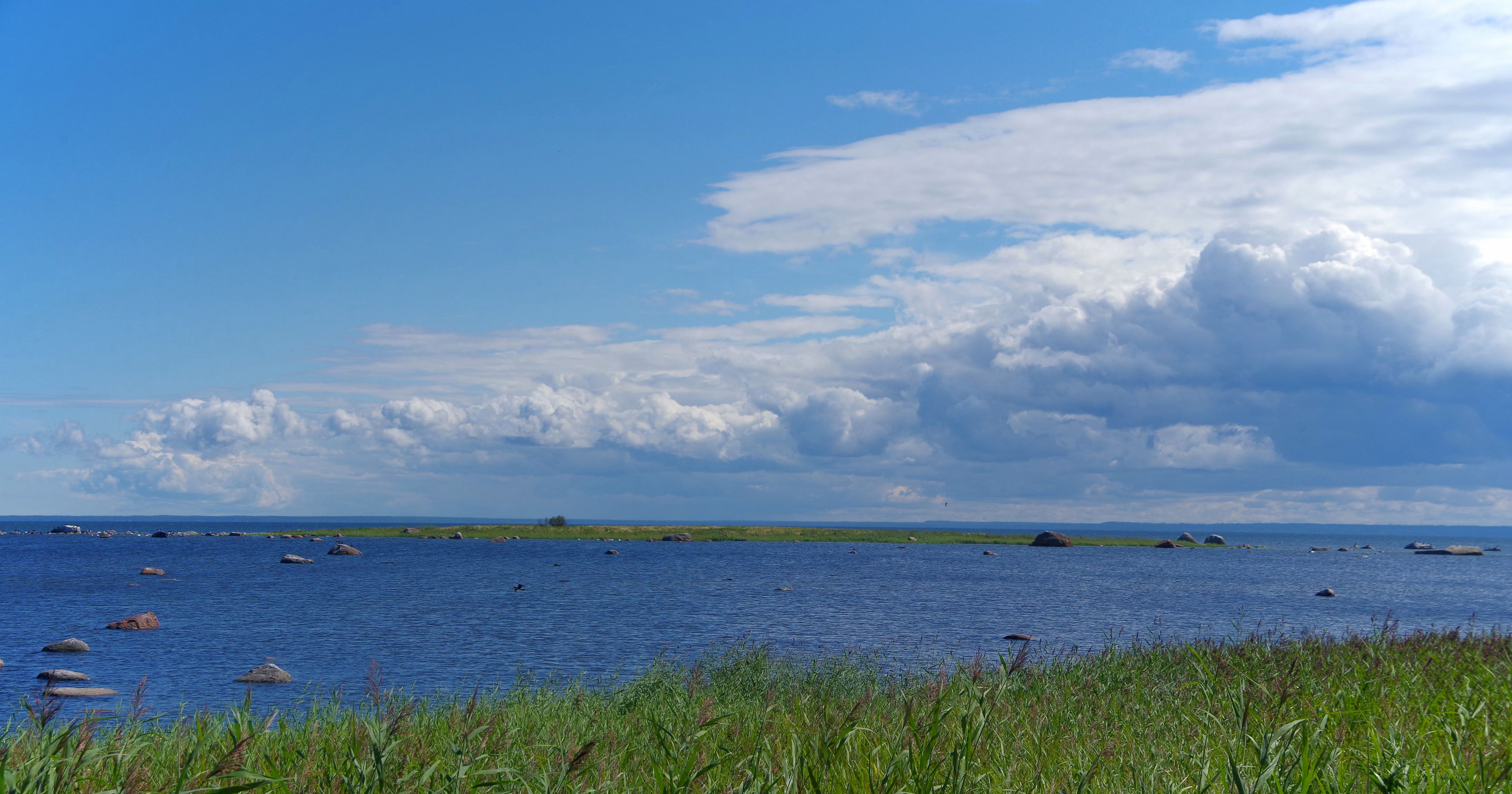
View of Allu Island

Allu is an island belonging to the country of Estonia.

== See also ==
- List of islands of Estonia
