= Laevaranna =

Village in Estonia

- Village
- Location in Estonia
- Coordinates: 58°22′53″N 22°56′10″E
- Country: Estonia
- County: Saare County
- Municipality: Saaremaa Parish

Population (2011 Census)
  - Total: 5

Laevaranna (until 2017 Rannaküla) is a village in Saaremaa Parish, Saare County, Estonia, on the island of Saaremaa. As of the 2011 census, the settlement's population was 5.

The small islet of Pihanasv in Kõiguste Bay (part of the Gulf of Riga) belongs to Laevaranna.
