= Vareslaid (Väinameri) =

Island in Estonia

Coordinates: 58°45′52″N 23°04′45″E

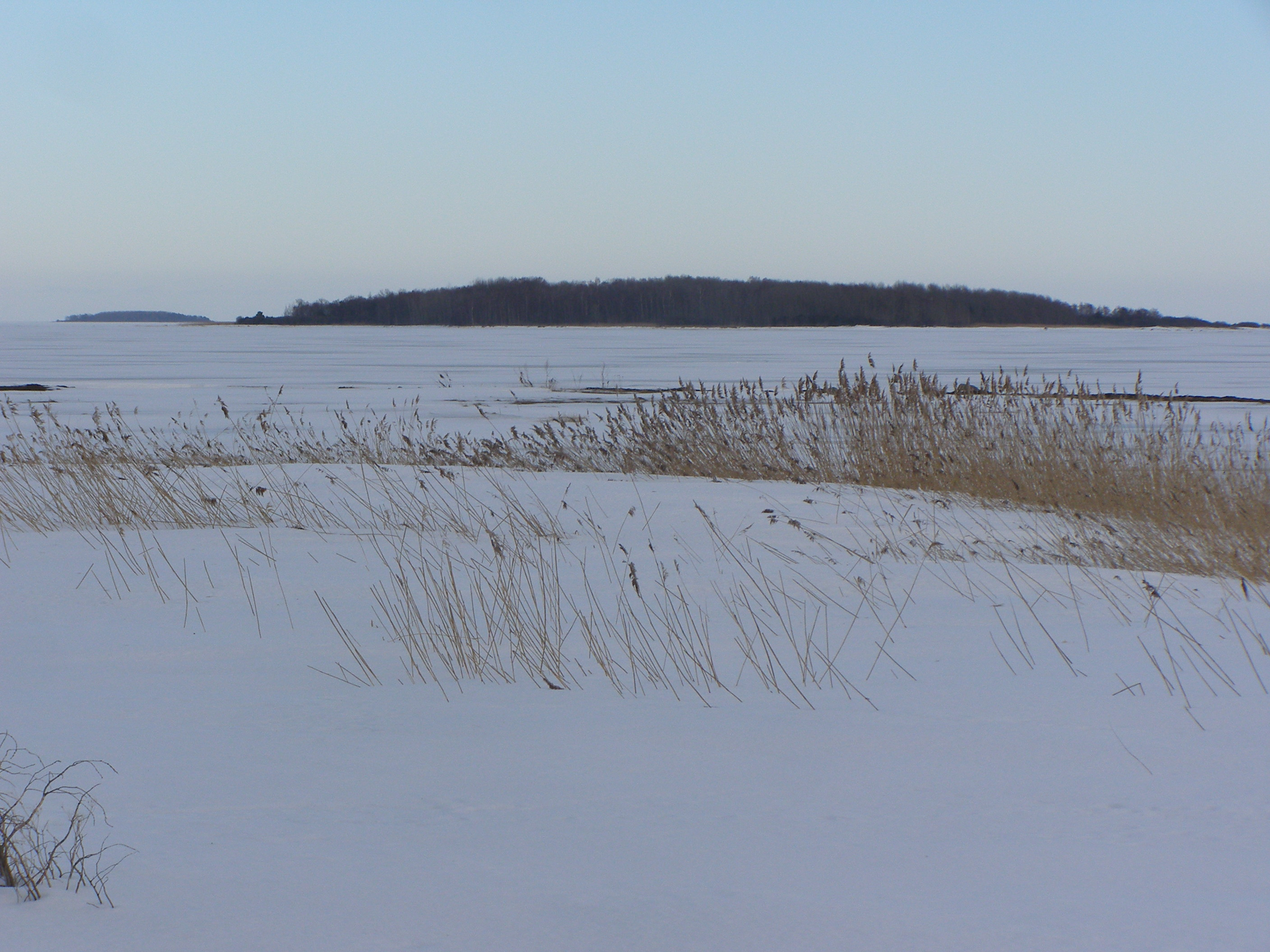
Vareslaid seen from Hanikatsi laid.

Vareslaid is an island belonging to the country of Estonia around Väinameri Sea in the Gulf of Riga, its size spans 0.324 km$^2$ (0.125 mi$^2$). The coastline around the island is 2.6 km (1.61 mi). Based on estimates the population is 9.

== See also ==
List of islands of Estonia
