= Esirahu =

Island in Estonia

Coordinates: 58°47′30.14″N 23°27′46.87″E

Esirahu is an island in Estonia. Esirahu is located in the village of Puise in Lääne County.

== See also ==
List of islands of Estonia
