= Võrkrahu =

Island in Estonia

Coordinates: 58°20′03″N 21°56′17″E

Võrkrahu is a small islet belonging to the country of Estonia off the west coast of the larger island of Saaremaa in the Kuusnõmme Gulf of the Baltic Sea. It is administered by Lääne-Saare Parish. Võrkrahu lies in an oblong north–south direction and is covered in pine and junipers. It covers an area of 6.07618 hectares and a circumference of 1.32628 kilometers and is part of Vilsandi National Park.

Additionally, there is another islet in the Baltic Sea named Võrkrahu, off the coast of Hiiumaa. However, it is more commonly called Paasrahu.
