= Roscoe Glacier =

Glacier in Antarctica

- Location within Antarctica
- Location: Queen Mary Land
- Coordinates: 66°30′S 95°20′E
- Length: 12 nmi (22 km; 14 mi)
- Width: 5 nmi (9 km; 6 mi)
- Thickness: unknown
- Terminus: Shackleton Ice Shelf
- Status: unknown

Roscoe Glacier (66°30′S 95°20′E) is an Antarctic channel glacier, 12 nautical miles (22 km) long and 3 to 5 nautical miles (9 km) wide, debouching from a small valley onto the west portion of Shackleton Ice Shelf, midway between Cape Moyes and Junction Corner. Charted as a valley depression during a southern reconnaissance in March 1912 by F. Wild and other members of the Western Base Party of the Australasian Antarctic Expedition under Mawson. Delineated from aerial photographs taken by U.S. Navy Operation Highjump, 1946–47, and named by the Advisory Committee on Antarctic Names (US-ACAN) for John H. Roscoe, geographer, author of Antarctic Bibliography (Washington, 1951), and scientific advisor to the director of United States Antarctic Program. Roscoe served as photogrammetrist with the central task group of U.S. Navy Operation Highjump, 1946–47, and with U.S. Navy Operation Windmill, 1947–48, and assisted the latter group in establishing astronomical control stations along Wilhelm II, Queen Mary, Knox and Budd Coasts.

== See also ==
- Roscoe Promontory
- List of glaciers in the Antarctic
- Glaciology
