= Gist =

Gist or GIST may refer to:

== Computing ==
- GiST (Generalized Search Tree), a flexible data structure for building search trees
- Gist (upper ontology), an upper ontology in information science
- Gist (GitHub), a pastebin service operated by GitHub
- Gist (graphics software), a scientific graphics library
- Gist (contact manager), an online contact management service acquired by BlackBerry

== Organizations ==
- German Institute of Science and Technology (Singapore), a research and education institute
- Global Institute of Science & Technology, Haldia, West Bengal, India
- Gwangju Institute of Science and Technology, a research university in Gwangju City, South Korea
- Global Innovation through Science and Technology initiative, an entrepreneur coaching organization

== Places ==
- Gist, Texas, an unincorporated community in the US
- Mount Gist, Queen Maud Land, Antarctica

== Other uses ==
- Gist (surname)
- Gastrointestinal stromal tumor, in medicine a neoplasm of the gastrointestinal tract
- The Gist (podcast), an American podcast by Slate magazine
- Gist (Nigerian term), a word in Nigerian English referring to idle chat or gossip
- Gist processing, a cognitive process in fuzzy-trace theory

== See also ==
- Jist (disambiguation)
