= Väike Siimurahu =

Island in Estonia

Coordinates: 58°48′18″N 23°27′59″E

Väike Siimurahu is a small uninhabited island in the Baltic Sea belonging to the country of Estonia.

Väike Siimurahu lies off the western coast of Estonia in the Väinameri Strait, north of the island Siimurahu and just off the Sassi peninsula on the Estonian mainland, covering an area of 2.177 ha, with a circumference of 0.56 km. It is administered by the mainland village of Puise in Ridala Parish, Lääne County. Other nearby islands include Tagarahu, Paljarahu, Esirahu and Mustarahu.

The island and surrounding area are protected as part of Matsalu National Park.
