= List of islands by name (H) =

This article features a list of islands sorted by their name beginning with the letter H.

== H ==
| Island's Name | Island group(s) | Country/Countries |
|---|---|---|
| Haaf Gruney | Shetland Islands | Scotland |
| Hadseløya | Vesterålen | Norway |
| Hailuoto | | Finland |
| Hainan | | China |
| Hajógyári-sziget | Danube River | Hungary |
| Halfmoon | Georgian Bay Ontario | Canada |
| Half Moon | South Shetland Islands | Claimed by Argentine Antarctica, Argentina, Antártica Chilena Province of Chile, and British Antarctic Territory of theUnited Kingdom |
| Half Moon | Louisiana | United States |
| Halfmile | Lake Winnipesaukee, New Hampshire | United States |
| Halib | | Eritrea |
| Halifax | | Namibia |
| Halki | Dodecanese | Greece |
| Hallig Habel | North Frisian Islands | Germany |
| Hamburger Hallig | North Frisian Islands | Germany |
| Hamilton Island | Whitsundays, Australia | Australia |
| Hanerahu | Väinameri Sea | Estonia |
| Hanikatsi laid | Väinameri Sea | Estonia |
| Hans | Kennedy Channel of Nares Strait | Claimed by both Denmark and Canada |
| Hao | Tuamotus, French Polynesia | France |
| Hara | Gulf of Finland | Estonia |
| Harat | Dahlak Archipelago | Eritrea |
| Harbour Round | Newfoundland and Labrador | Canada |
| Hareidlandet | Møre og Romsdal | Norway |
| Harilaid | Baltic Sea | Estonia |
| Harmil | Dahlak Archipelago | Eritrea |
| Harris | Rice Lake, Ontario | Canada |
| Hascosay | Shetland Islands | Scotland |
| Hatch | Georgian Bay Ontario | Canada |
| Hateruma | Yaeyama Islands part of the Sakishima Islands part of the Ryukyu Islands | Japan |
| Hatoma | Yaeyama Islands part of the Sakishima Islands part of the Ryukyu Islands | Japan |
| Hatteras | Outer Banks, North Carolina | United States |
| Havra | Shetland Islands | Scotland |
| Hawaiʻi | Hawaii | United States |
| Hawar | Hawar Islands | Bahrain |
| Hawk | New Jersey | United States |
| Hawkesbury | British Columbia | Canada |
| Hawks Nest | Lake Winnipesaukee, New Hampshire | United States |
| Hay | Georgian Bay Ontario | Canada |
| Hayden | Columbia River, Oregon | United States |
| Hayman Island | Whitsundays, Australia | Australia |
| Hecate | British Columbia | Canada |
| Hei Ling Chau | Islands District, Hong Kong | China |
| Heimaey | Vestmannaeyjar | Iceland |
| Helgö | Lake Mälaren | Sweden |
| Heligoland | Heligoland Bight, Schleswig-Holstein | Germany |
| Helliar Holm | Orkney Islands | Scotland |
| Helnæs | Islands of the waters south of Funen | Denmark |
| Hen | Lake Erie, Ontario | Canada |
| Hen and Chicken | Georgian Bay Ontario | Canada |
| Henderson | Pitcairn Islands | (United Kingdom) British overseas territories |
| Henderson | Shackleton Ice Shelf, Antarctica | |
| Henderson | Ohio River, Kentucky | United States |
| Hendurabi | Persian Gulf | Iran |
| Hengam | Persian Gulf | Iran |
| Henry | San Juan Islands, Washington | United States |
| Isle aux Herbes | Alabama | United States |
| Hereheretue | Duke of Gloucester Islands, Tuamotus, French Polynesia | France |
| Herm | Channel Islands | Guernsey |
| Hermit | Lake Winnipesaukee, New Hampshire | United States |
| Heron | Lake Mead, Nevada | United States |
| Heron Island | Queensland, Australia | Australia |
| Herrs | Allegheny River, Pennsylvania | United States |
| Hertsön | | Sweden |
| Herschel | Lake Huron Ontario | Canada |
| Herschel | Yukon | Canada |
| Hertzberg | Georgian Bay Ontario | Canada |
| Hess | Susquehanna River, Pennsylvania | United States |
| Hesselø | The Kattegat | Denmark |
| Hestan | Solway Firth, Scotland | United Kingdom |
| Hestur | Faroe Islands | Denmark |
| Heybeliada | Princes' Islands | Turkey |
| Hickory | West Lake Ontario | Canada |
| Hiddensee | Islands of the Baltic Sea | Germany |
| Hiiumaa | West Estonian archipelago; Baltic Sea | Estonia |
| Hilbre Island | Hilbre Islands | United Kingdom |
| Hildasay | Shetland Islands | Scotland |
| Hinchinbrook Island | North Queensland, Australia | Australia |
| Hinnøya | Vesterålen | Norway |
| Hisingen | Kattegat, Västergötland and Bohuslän | Sweden |
| Hispaniola | Antilles | Haiti and Dominican Republic |
| Hitra | Trondheimsfjord | Norway |
| Hiu | Torres Islands | Vanuatu |
| Hiwassee | Chickamauga Lake, Tennessee | United States |
| Hjelm | | Denmark |
| Hjortø | Islands of the waters south of Funen | Denmark |
| Hoak | Susquehanna River, Pennsylvania | United States |
| Hobbs | Tennessee River, Alabama | United States |
| Hobulaid | Väinameri Sea | Estonia |
| Hoëdic | Bretagne | France |
| Hoeksche Waard | South Holland | Netherlands |
| Hoffman | Illinois River, Illinois | United States |
| Hog | North Channel, Ontario | Canada |
| Hog | Ottawa River, Ontario | Canada |
| Hog | Essequibo River | Guyana |
| Hog | Narragansett Bay, Rhode Island | United States |
| Hog | Wisconsin | United States |
| Hog | Michigan | United States |
| Hog | James River, Virginia | United States |
| Hog | Petaluma River, California | United States |
| Hog | Tomales Bay, California | United States |
| Hog | Aleutian Islands, Alaska | United States |
| Hokkaidō | Japanese archipelago | Japan |
| Holm of Faray | The North Isles, Orkney Islands | Scotland |
| Holm of Huip | The North Isles, Orkney Islands | Scotland |
| Holm of Papay | The North Isles, Orkney Islands | Scotland |
| Holm of Scockness | The North Isles, Orkney Islands | Scotland |
| Hong Kong Island | Hong Kong | China |
| Honshū | Japanese archipelago | Japan |
| Hooge | North Frisian Islands | Germany |
| Hope | British Columbia | Canada |
| Hope | Georgian Bay, Ontario | Canada |
| Hopen | Svalbard | Norway |
| Hõralaid | Väinameri Sea | Estonia |
| Hormuz | Persian Gulf | Iran |
| Horn | Mississippi | United States |
| Hornby | Gulf Islands,British Columbia | Canada |
| Horse | Thimble Islands, Connecticut | United States |
| Horse | Shetland Islands | Scotland |
| Horse | Summer Isles | Scotland |
| Horse Islands | Newfoundland and Labrador | Canada |
| Houat | Bretagne | France |
| Housay | Out Skerries, Shetland Islands | Scotland |
| Howakil | Dahlak Archipelago | Eritrea |
| Howe | Saint Lawrence River Ontario | Canada |
| Howell | Missouri River,Missouri | United States |
| Howland Island | | |
| Hoy | The South Isles, Orkney Islands | Scotland |
| Huahine | Windward Islands, Society Islands, French Polynesia | Overseas collectivity of France |
| Hauhine Iti | Windward Islands, Society Islands, French Polynesia | Overseas collectivity of France |
| Hauhine Nui | Windward Islands, Society Islands, French Polynesia | Overseas collectivity of France |
| Huckleberry | Georgian Bay (Parry Sound) Ontario | Canada |
| Hülgerahu | Väinaeri Sea | Estonia |
| Hull | Lake Winnipesaukee, New Hampshire | United States |
| Hunda | The South Isles, Orkney Islands | Scotland |
| Hundvåg | Øyane archipelago, Stavanger Municipality, Rogaland | Norway |
| Huney | Shetland Islands | Scotland |
| Hurricane | Illinois River, Illinois | United States |
| Hurricane | Ohio River, Kentucky | United States |
| Hvar | | Croatia |
| Hydra | Saronic Islands | Greece |

== See also ==
- List of islands (by country)
- List of islands by area
- List of islands by population
- List of islands by highest point
