= Davis Sea =

Marginal sea off East Antarctica between West and Shackleton Ice Shelves

Coordinates: 66°S 92°E

Davis Sea as part of the Southern Ocean, with proposed names for bordering seas also depicted.

Davis Sea is an area of the sea along the coast of East Antarctica between West Ice Shelf in the west and the Shackleton Ice Shelf in the east, or between 82° and 96°E. The name "Davis Sea" appears in most leading geographically authoritative publications such as the 2014 10th edition World Atlas from the National Geographic Society and the 2014 12th edition of the Times Atlas of the World, unlike neighboring proposed water body names such as the Russian-proposed Cooperation Sea to the west.

According to the Great Soviet Encyclopedia, it stretches from 87°E to 98°E, and is up to 1,300 m (4,300 ft) deep. Its area is given as only 21,000 km^{2} (8,100 sq mi). Other authorities such as National Geographic assign it a much smaller extent.

The sea borders the Leopold and Astrid Coast portion of Princess Elizabeth Land, then Kaiser Wilhelm II Land, Pravda Coast, and Queen Mary Land.

The never-approved 2002 draft fourth edition of Limits of Oceans and Seas proposed the naming of the Tryoshnikova Gulf (named after Alexey Tryoshnikov), located in the southern part of the Davis Sea.

About 55 km (34 mi) off the coast of Queen Mary Land is Drygalski Island. The Russian Mirny Station was built on the coast of Queen Mary Land in 1956. Roscoe Glacier flows into the eastern part of Davis Sea. Close offshore are Bigelow Rock and the Gillies Islands.

The sea was discovered by the Australian Antarctic Expedition (1911–1914) from the Aurora. It was named by Sir Douglas Mawson for Captain John King Davis, master of the Aurora and second in command of the expedition.

== See also ==
- Davis Station
- Tressler Bank
