= Kennedy Peak =

Kennedy Peak may refer to:

- Kennedy Peak (Antarctica), a peak protruding above the continental ice near Denman Glacier, Antarctica
- Kennedy Peak (Myanmar), a peak in Chin State of Burma (Myanmar) and site of a battle in 1944

== See also ==
- List of peaks named Kennedy
- Mount Kennedy
