= Glenzer Glacier =

Glacier in Antarctica

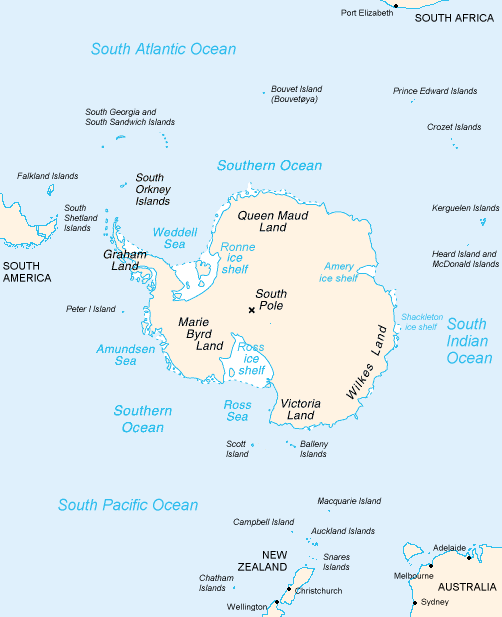
- Map of Antarctica, with Wilkes Land slightly to the right

- Location within Antarctica
- Location: Wilkes Land
- Coordinates: 65°58′00″S 103°15′00″E
- Length: 5 nautical miles (9.3 km; 5.8 mi)
- Thickness: unknown
- Terminus: Shackleton Ice Shelf
- Status: unknown

Glenzer Glacier (65°58′S 103°15′E) is a glacier 5 nautical miles (9 km) west of Conger Glacier, draining northward from Knox Coast into the eastern part of the Shackleton Ice Shelf, Antarctica. It was mapped by Gardner Dean Blodgett (1955) from air photos taken by U.S. Navy Operation Highjump (1946–47). It was named by the Advisory Committee on Antarctic Names for Lieutenant Hubert Glenzer, Jr., a pilot with U.S. Navy Operation Windmill (1947–48), who assisted in operations resulting in the establishment of astronomical control stations along the coast from Wilhelm II Coast to Budd Coast.

In March 2022, an ice shelf in front of the Glenzer Glacier collapsed.

== See also ==
- List of glaciers in the Antarctic
- Glaciology
