= Grace Rocks =

Prominent rock outcrops in Antarctica

The Grace Rocks (66°25′S 100°33′E) are prominent rock outcrops situated at the south side of the mouth of Apfel Glacier at its junction with Scott Glacier, Antarctica. They were mapped from air photos taken by U.S. Navy Operation Highjump, 1946–47, and named by the Advisory Committee on Antarctic Names for Lieutenant Philip J. Grace, U.S. Navy, a pilot with U.S. Navy Operation Windmill, 1947–48, who assisted in operations which resulted in the establishment of astronomical control stations from Wilhelm II Coast to Budd Coast.
