= Kumari (island) =

Island in Estonia

Coordinates: 58°46′N 23°21′E

Kumari is an Estonian island in Väinameri Sea, and has size of 17,5 ha. It is a part of Matsalu National Park.

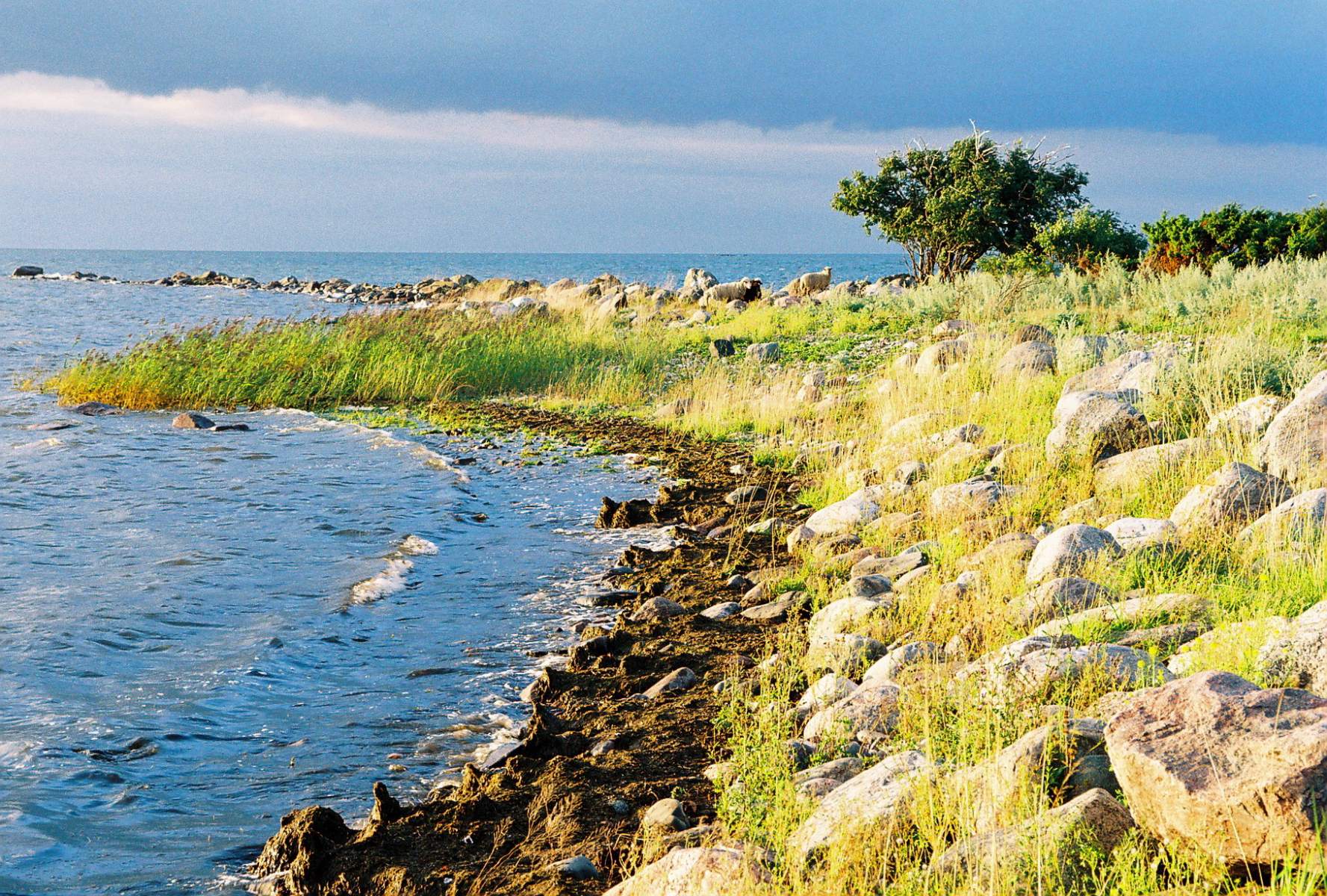
Kumari island, Estonia

== Location ==
The island is located in Lääne County, in the urban municipality of Haapsalu, as part of village of Puise. Under 1 km to its south-west lies Sipelgarahi island, around 300 meters to the north lies Tondirahu island, at 1,2 kilometers north lies Valgerahu. Nearest point to mainland is Puise's Nose which lies 5,5 kilometers to the east, Muhu lies 11 km south-west, Hiiumaa Parish nearest point is Kõverlaid at 9 kilometers.

It's characterised by its triangular shape. At its highest point Kumari has 6,8 meters above sea level.

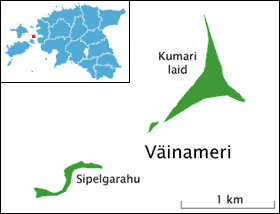
Map showing Kumari island and Sipelgarahu, Estonia

== Fauna and flora ==
Kumari laid has dense juniper growth, meadows and beach meadows.

Kumari is a nesting and stopping place for many species of birds.

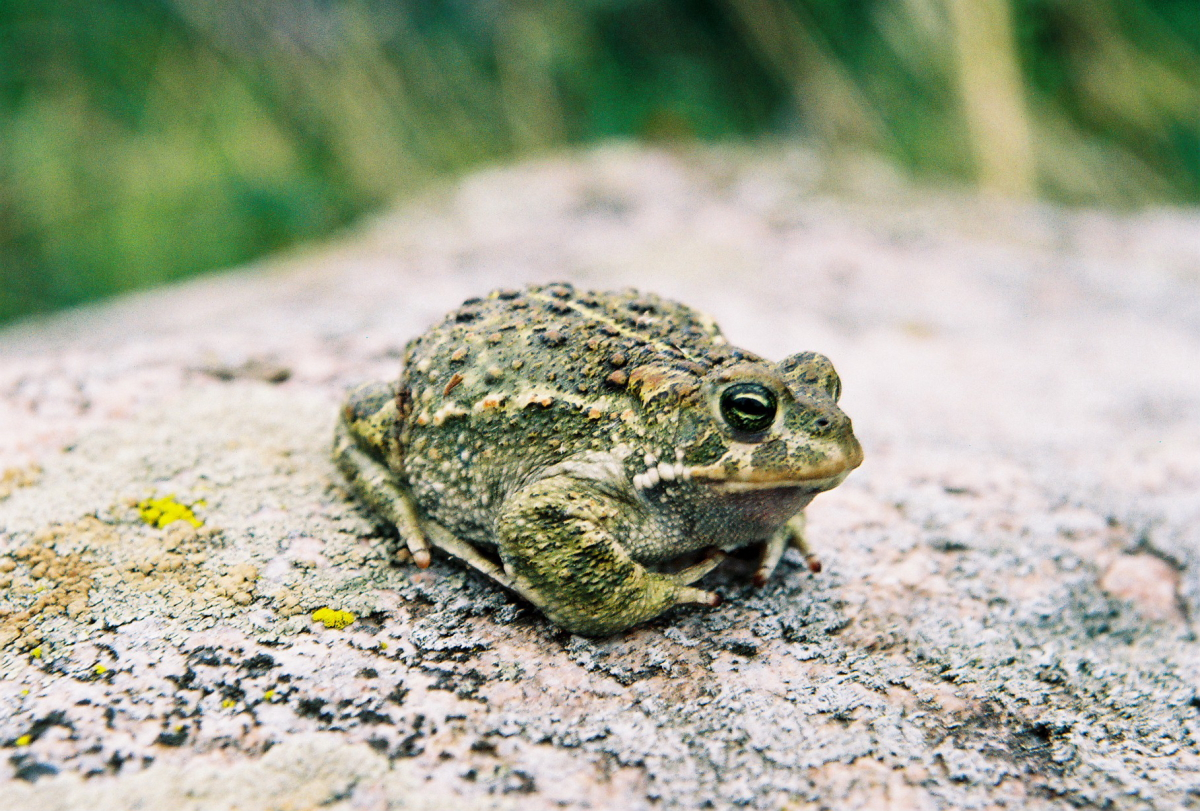
Nutterjack toad

Natterjack toad lives and thrives on the island. Sheep also live all year round on the island, first brought by local people, later they were reintroduced by conservationists.

== Human activity ==
Economic activities, use of natural resources and human presence are prohibited on Kumari laid and in 500-metre-wide water area around island. Exception to it are actions of scientific research, surveillance and rescue work.

During summers conservation workers and volunteers visit island to cut junipers and mow hay.

There was tavern and other building on the island but they didn't survive to present day.

In 2009 Estonian Maritime Administration decommissioned sea mark as it was deemed obsolete. First seam mark appeared on Kumari in 1851.

== Kumari's cultural story ==
In summer of 1937 ship cruising Narva-Jõesuu – Kotka line and belonging to G. Sergo & Ko was named after island. Ornithologist Eerik Sits (Eerik Kumari) changes his surname after island in 1938.

== See also ==
- List of islands of Estonia
