= Tressler =

Tressler is a surname. Notable people with the name include:

- Georg Tressler (1917–2007), German film actor and film director
- Harry Tressler, fictional character from the BBC medical drama Holby City
- Otto Tressler (1871–1965), German film actor
- S. K. Tressler, Pakistani Christian and former government minister

== See also ==
- Tressler Bank, Undersea bank of the Southern Ocean
