= Gillies Islands =

Island group in Queen Mary Land, Antarctica

The Gillies Islands (66°32′S 96°25′E) are three small, rocky islands protruding above Shackleton Ice Shelf 3 nautical miles (6 km) north of Cape Moyes.

Discovered by the Western Base Party of the Australasian Antarctic Expedition under Douglas Mawson, 1911–14, and named for F.J. Gillies, chief engineer of the ship Aurora. Astronomical control was established on the central island by U.S. Navy Operation Windmill personnel in January 1948.

== See also ==
- List of antarctic and sub-antarctic islands
