= Masson Island =

Island in Queen Mary Land, Antarctica

- Location within Antarctica

Geography
- Location: Antarctica
- Coordinates: 66°08′S 96°35′E
- Length: 31 km (19.3 mi)
- Highest elevation: 465 m (1526 ft)

Administration
- Administered under the Antarctic Treaty System

Demographics
- Population: Uninhabited

Masson Island or Mission Island is an ice-covered island about 31 kilometres (17 nmi) long and rising to 465 metres (1,526 ft), lying 17 kilometres (9 nmi) northwest of Henderson Island within the Shackleton Ice Shelf. Masson Island is located in the western part of Mawson Sea at 66°08′S 96°35′E and has an elevation of 465 metres (1,526 ft). Masson Island was discovered in February 1912 by the Australian Antarctic Expedition under Sir Douglas Mawson, who named it for Professor Sir David Orme Masson of Melbourne, a member of the Australian Antarctic Expedition Advisory Committee.

== See also ==
- Composite Antarctic Gazetteer
- List of Antarctic and sub-Antarctic islands
- List of Antarctic islands south of 60° S
- List of islands of Australia
- SCAR
- Territorial claims in Antarctica
