= Mount Garan =

Mountain in Queen Mary Land, Antarctica

Mount Garan (67°32′S 98°56′E) is a mountain marked by a cluster of small peaks, rising 9 nautical miles (17 km) southwest of Mount Strathcona near the head of Denman Glacier in Antarctica. It was mapped from aerial photographs taken by U.S. Navy Operation Highjump, 1946–47, and was named by the Advisory Committee on Antarctic Names for E.M. Garan, aerial photographer on Operation Highjump flights over this and other coastal areas.
