= Hippo Island =

Island in Queen Mary Land, Antarctica

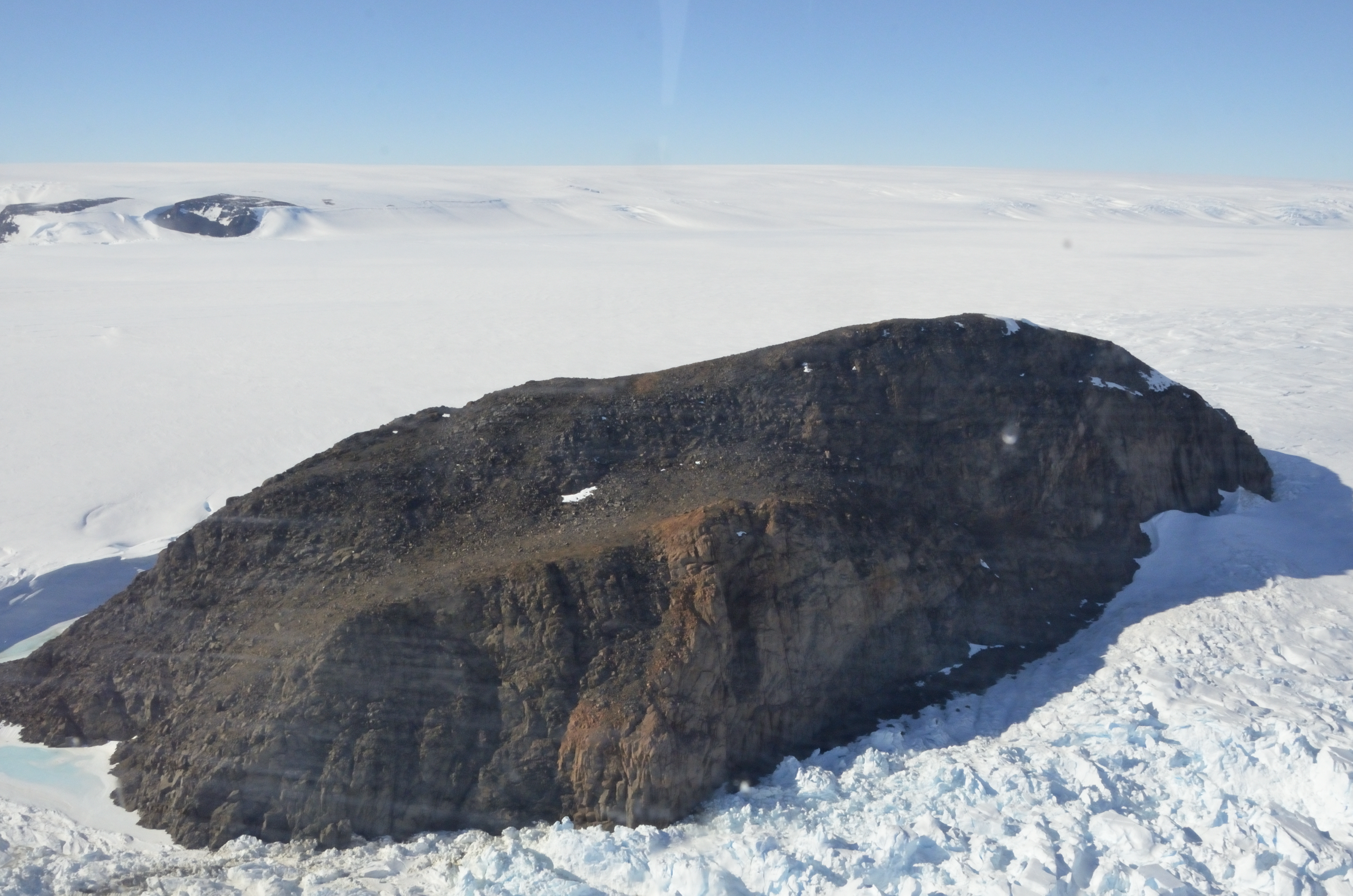
Hippo Island from the north.

Hippo Island (66°25′S 98°10′E) is a steep, rocky island, 0.5 nautical miles (1 km) long, which rises above the Shackleton Ice Shelf of Antarctica 1.5 nautical miles (3 km) north of Delay Point. It was discovered by the Western Base Party of the Australasian Antarctic Expedition under Mawson, 1911–14, who so named it because of its hippo-like shape.

== See also ==
- List of antarctic and sub-antarctic islands
