= Henderson Island =

Henderson Island may refer to:

- Henderson Island (Pitcairn Islands), in the southern Pacific Ocean
- Henderson Island (Shackleton Ice Shelf), in Antarctica
- Henderson Island (Colorado), located in the South Platte River, US; See John D. Henderson
- Henderson Island (Kentucky), located in the Ohio River, US; See List of islands by name (H)
- Henderson Islets, south-eastern Australia
