= Mawson Sea =

Proposed sea name

Coordinates: 65°00′S 105°00′E

The proposed Mawson Sea name and other proposed sea names as part of the Southern Ocean

Mawson Sea is the proposed name of a sea along the Queen Mary Land coast of East Antarctica east of the Shackleton Ice Shelf. West of it, on the western side of Shackleton Ice Shelf, would be the Davis Sea. To the east would be Bowman Island and Vincennes Bay.

The name was proposed as part of the 2002 International Hydrographic Organization (IHO) draft. This draft was never approved by the IHO (or any other organization), and the 1953 IHO document (which does not contain the name) remains currently in force. Leading geographic authorities and atlases do not use the name, including the 2014 10th edition World Atlas from the National Geographic Society and the 2014 12th edition of the Times Atlas of the World.

Two important glaciers debouche into the water here: Scott Glacier and Denman Glacier. Calving of Denman Glacier gives rise to the periodically appearing Pobeda Ice Island.

It would be named in honor of Australian Antarctic explorer Douglas Mawson.
