= Scott Glacier =

Scott Glacier may refer to any of these glaciers:

- Scott Glacier (Alaska), a glacier in the Chugach Mountains, near Cordova, Alaska
- Scott Glacier (Transantarctic Mountains), a major glacier flowing from the East Antarctic Ice Sheet through the Queen Maud subrange of the Transantarctic Mountains into the Ross Ice Shelf
- Scott Glacier (East Antarctica), a glacier on the outer coast of East Antarctica
