= Avalanche Rocks =

Avalanche Rocks (66°31′S 98°2′E) is a vertical rock outcrop rising to 185 metres (600 ft), midway between Delay Point and Jones Rocks on the west side of Melba Peninsula, Antarctica. It was discovered in September 1912 by the Australasian Antarctic Expedition under Douglas Mawson and so named because of the occurrence of a tremendous avalanche while members of the expedition were encamped nearby.
