= Baldwin Rocks =

The Baldwin Rocks (66°24′S 98°45′E) are a group of rock outcrops about 5 nautical miles (10 km) northwest of Watson Bluff on the north side of David Island. They were charted by the Australasian Antarctic Expedition, 1911–14, under Mawson, and named by him for Joseph M. Baldwin of the Melbourne Observatory.
