= Cape Dovers =

Cape in Antarctica

Cape Dovers (66°29′S 97°8′E) is a cape fronting on the Shackleton Ice Shelf, 5 nautical miles (9 km) south of Henderson Island. It was discovered by the Western Base party of the Australasian Antarctic Expedition, 1911–1914, under Mawson, and named for G. Dovers, cartographer with the expedition.
