= Cape Hordern =

Cape Hordern is an ice-free cape, overlain by morainic drift, at the northwest end of the Bunger Hills in Antarctica. It was probably sighted from Watson Bluff (66°25′S 98°57′E) by A.L. Kennedy and other members of the Western Base Party of the Australasian Antarctic Expedition under Mawson, 1911–1914, who charted the west wall of what appeared to be two small islands lying north of Cape Hoadley in about 100°35′E. It was named "Hordern Island" by Mawson for Sir Samuel Hordern of Sydney, a patron of the expedition. It was renamed Cape Hordern by the Advisory Committee on Antarctic Names (US-ACAN) following correlation of Kennedy's map with the US-ACAN map of 1955 compiled from aerial photographs taken by U.S. Navy Operation Highjump, 1946–47.
