= Cape Charcot =

Headland in Queen Mary Land, Antarctica

Cape Charcot (66°26′S 98°30′E) is a rocky headland at the northeast end of the Melba Peninsula, 3 nautical miles (6 km) west of David Island. It was discovered by the Australasian Antarctic Expedition under Mawson, 1911–1914, who named it for Dr. Jean-Baptiste Charcot, French Antarctic explorer.
