= Tracy Glacier (Antarctica) =

Glacier in Wilkes Land, Antarctica

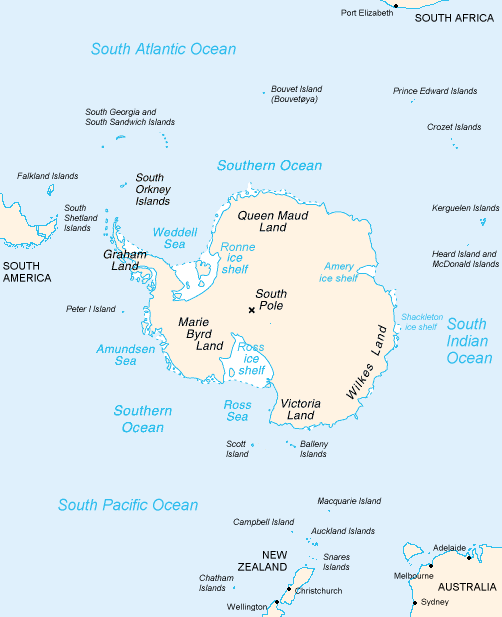
- Map of Antarctica, with Wilkes Land slightly to the right

- Location within Antarctica
- Type: channel
- Location: Wilkes Land
- Coordinates: 65°57′00″S 102°20′00″E
- Thickness: unknown
- Terminus: Shackleton Ice Shelf
- Status: unknown

Tracy Glacier (65°57′S 102°20′E) is a channel glacier flowing to the Shackleton Ice Shelf 4 nautical miles (7 km) southwest of Cape Elliott. Delineated from aerial photographs taken by U.S. Navy Operation Highjump, 1946–47. Named by Advisory Committee on Antarctic Names (US-ACAN) for Lieutenant Lloyd W. Tracy, U.S. Navy, pilot with U.S. Navy Operation Windmill, 1947–48, who assisted in operations which resulted in the establishment of astronomical control stations from Wilhelm II Coast to Budd Coast.

== See also ==
- List of glaciers in the Antarctic
- Glaciology
