= Bigelow Rock =

Rock in Queen Mary Land, Antarctica

Bigelow Rock (66°10′S 95°25′E) is a low, ice-covered rock about 150 feet (50 m) long, with numerous rock exposures close above sea level, lying immediately west of Shackleton Ice Shelf, about 25 nautical miles (50 km) northeast of Junction Corner. It was delineated from aerial photographs taken by U.S. Navy Operation Highjump (OpHjp), 1946–47. An astronomical control station was established on the rock by U.S. Navy Operation Windmill (OpWml), 1947–48. It was named by the Advisory Committee on Antarctic Names for Technical Sergeant George H. Bigelow, United States Marine Corps, a tractor driver-mechanic with OpHjp and OpWml.
