= Siimurahu =

Island in Estonia

Coordinates: 58°48′08″N 23°28′15″E

Siimurahu is a small uninhabited island in the Baltic Sea belonging to the country of Estonia.

Siimurahu lies off the western coast of Estonia in the Väinameri Strait, southeast of the island Väike Siimurahu and just off the Sassi peninsula on the Estonian mainland, covering an area of 4.376 ha, with a circumference of 0.93 km. It is administered by the mainland village of Puise in Haapsalu municipality, Lääne County.

The island and surrounding area are protected as part of Matsalu National Park.
