= List of peaks named Kennedy =

Kennedy Peak or Mount Kennedy or variations may refer to one of a number of notable peaks named Kennedy. These are generally named after John F. Kennedy, U.S. president during 1960–1963. It is also possible that some may be named after other people named Kennedy.

The peaks of this name are:

Peak name	Country	County, Province/State	Coordinates	Elevation	Prominence	Notes
Kennedy Peak (Antarctica)	Antarctica		67°13′S 99°11′E			Protrudes above the continental ice near Denman Glacier
Kennedy Peak (Burma)	Burma	Chin	23°19′03″N 93°45′42″E	2703 m 8,868 ft	1509 m 4,951 ft	One of the world's relatively few Ultra-prominent peaks, rising more than 1,500 meters above all neighbors.
Mount Kennedy	Canada	Yukon	60°20′28″N 138°57′59″W	4250 m 13,944 ft	390 m 1,280 ft	First climbed by JFK's brother RFK and others in 1965.
Kennedy Peak (Arizona)	United States	Graham County, Arizona	32°38′11″N 110°18′21″W	2296 m 7,532 ft	289 m 949 ft	
Kennedy Mountain (Fresno County, California)	United States	Fresno County, California	36°52′44″N 118°40′06″W	3485 m 11,433 ft	193 m 633 ft	
Kennedy Peak (Tuolumne County, California)	United States	Tuolumne County, California	38°14′43″N 119°39′17″W	3237 m 10,620 ft	121 m 398 ft	
Mount Kennedy (Colorado)	United States	La Plata County, Colorado	37°35′20″N 107°37′36″W	4001 m 13,125 ft	75 m 245 ft	
Kennedy Point	United States	Esmeralda County, Nevada	37°53′05″N 118°18′44″W	3091 m 10,140 ft	43 m 140 ft	
Kennedy Peak (Virginia)	United States	Page County, Virginia	38°44′30″N 78°29′15″W	771 m 2,529 ft	165 m 540 ft	
Kennedy Peak (Washington)	United States	Snohomish County, Washington	48°07′55″N 121°07′30″W	2518 m 8,261 ft	85 m 280 ft	
