= Tracy Glacier =

Tracy Glacier may refer to the following glaciers:

- Tracy Glacier (Antarctica), in Wilkes Land, Antarctica
- Tracy Glacier (Greenland), in the Avannaata municipality of Greenland
