= Jones Rocks =

Rocky outcrop in Antarctica

The Jones Rocks (66°34′S 97°50′E) are coastal outcrops 4 nautical miles (7 km) southwest of the Avalanche Rocks, on the east shore of the Bay of Winds. They were discovered by the Australasian Antarctic Expedition, 1911–14, under Mawson, and named by him for Dr. Sydney Evan Jones, medical officer with the expedition.
