= Cape Elliott =

Cape in Wilkes Land, Antarctica

Cape Elliott (65°52′S 102°35′E) is an ice-covered cape marking the northern extremity of the Knox Coast of Wilkes Land, Antarctica. It fronts on Shackleton Ice Shelf, 28 nautical miles (52 km) southwest of Bowman Island. It was delineated from aerial photographs taken by U.S. Navy Operation Highjump (1946–47) and named by the Advisory Committee on Antarctic Names after J.L. Elliott, chaplain on the sloop Vincennes of the United States Exploring Expedition (1838–1842) under Charles Wilkes.
