= Mount Amundsen =

Nunatak in Wilkes Land, Antarctica

- Location within Antarctica

Highest point
- Coordinates: 67°14′S 100°45′E

Geography
- Location: Antarctica

Mount Amundsen is a nunatak lying east of Denman Glacier, about 11 nautical miles (20 km) northeast of Mount Sandow. It was discovered by the Western Base Party of the Australasian Antarctic Expedition (1911–14) under Mawson, and named by Mawson for Roald Amundsen, the Norwegian polar explorer, who was the first to attain the South Pole.
