= Mount Gist =

Mountain in Queen Mary Land, Antarctica

Mount Gist (67°21′S 98°54′E) is a mountain 8 nautical miles (15 km) northwest of Mount Strathcona near the head of Denman Glacier in Antarctica. It was mapped from aerial photographs taken by U.S. Navy Operation Highjump (1946–47), and named by the Advisory Committee on Antarctic Names for Lieutenant Francis J. Gist, United States Navy, co-pilot and navigator on Operation Highjump photographic flights over this and other coastal areas between 14°E and 164°E.
