= Conger Glacier =

Glacier in Antarctica

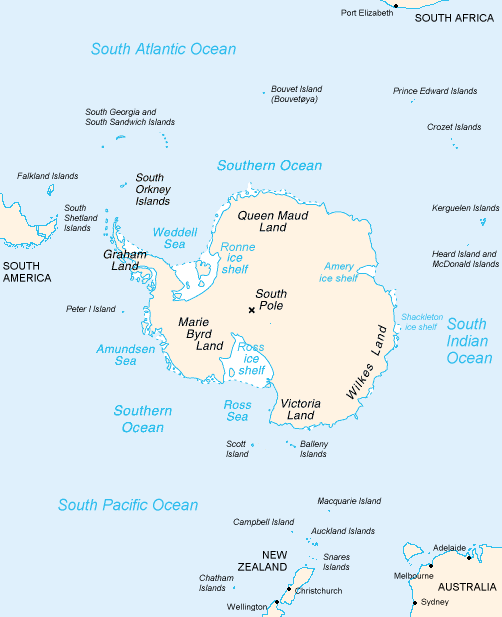
- Map of Antarctica, with Wilkes Land slightly to the right

- Location within Antarctica
- Location: Wilkes Land
- Coordinates: 66°58′00″S 109°00′00″E
- Length: 5 nautical miles (9.3 km; 5.8 mi)
- Thickness: unknown
- Terminus: Shackleton Ice Shelf
- Status: collapsed

Conger Glacier (66°2′S 103°33′E) is a glacier 5 nautical miles (9 km) east of Glenzer Glacier, flowing north into the eastern part of the Shackleton Ice Shelf. It was mapped by Gardner Dean Blodgett (1955) from air photos taken by U.S. Navy Operation Highjump (1946–47). It was named by the Advisory Committee on Antarctic Names for Richard R. Conger, chief photographer's mate with U.S. Navy Operation Windmill (1947–48), who assisted in establishing astronomical control stations along the coast from Wilhelm II Coast to Budd Coast.

On 25 March 2022, it was reported that Conger Ice Shelf had collapsed around ten days earlier, as evidenced by satellite data. The collapse had not been anticipated by experts, although a gradual shrinking of the glacier had been observed since the mid-2000s, and a more rapid one since early 2020. Whether the collapse was related to the preceding abnormally high temperatures in the area was not immediately clear. An ice shelf is a large floating platform of ice that forms where a glacier or ice sheet flows down to a coastline and onto the ocean surface; it stops a glacier from rapidly flowing into an ocean.

== See also ==
- List of glaciers in the Antarctic
- Glaciology
