= Paljarahu =

Island in Estonia

Coordinates: 58°48′03″N 23°26′37″E

Paljarahu is a small island in the Baltic Sea belonging to the country of Estonia.

Paljarahu lies off the western coast of Estonia in the Väinameri Strait, northwest of the island of Tagarahu and south of the island of Mustarahu. Paljarahu occupies an area of 2.737 ha, with a circumference of approximately. 0.887 km.

It is administered by the mainland village of Puise in Ridala Parish, Lääne County.

The island and surrounding area are protected as part of Matsalu National Park.
