= Mount Sandow =

Nunatak in Queen Mary Land, Antarctica

Mount Sandow (67°22′S 100°24′E) is a nunatak overlooking the Denman Glacier about 11 miles southwest of Mount Amundsen in Antarctica. It was discovered by the Western Base Party of the Australasian Antarctic Expedition (1911–14) under Mawson, and named by Mawson for Eugen Sandow (1867-1925) of London, a patron of the expedition.
