= Helen Glacier Tongue =

Glacier tongue in Antarctica

Helen Glacier Tongue (66°33′S 94°0′E) is a glacier tongue which extends seaward from Helen Glacier on the coast of Antarctica. It was discovered in November 1912 by the Western Base Party of the Australasian Antarctic Expedition under Mawson, and is named after Helen Glacier.

== See also ==
- Wright Bay
