= Pravda Coast =

Coordinates: 66°S 90°E

Pravda Coast (Russian: Берег Правды) is a coast of the Davis Sea in the Eastern Antarctica. It is situated between 88° and 100° E. Pravda Coast was described in 1956 by Soviet Antarctic Expedition. The coast was named in honor of the newspaper Pravda. Also there is a Russian polar Mirny Station here. An edge of the mainland ice sheet, the Pravda Coast becomes the West Ice Shelf in the west and the Shackleton Ice Shelf in the east. It rises abruptly to the south, and 100 km from the coast reaches an elevation of more than 1.5 km; the ice is 1,000 m thick. Bedrock is rare and insignificant in area.

== Links ==
- "Правды" берег (ru)
