= Barr Smith =

Barr Smith may refer to:

== People ==
- Robert Barr Smith (1824–1915), Australian businessman and philanthropist
- Tom Elder Barr Smith (1863–1941), South Australian pastoralist and philanthropist
- Sir Tom Elder Barr Smith (1904–1968), South Australian pastoralist and businessman

== Other ==
- Barr Smith Library of the University of Adelaide
- Mount Barr Smith, Antarctica, named in 1912 by Douglas Mawson after Robert Barr Smith
