= Sipelgarahu =

Island in Estonia

Coordinates: 58.7525°N 23.3172°E

Sipelgarahu is an Estonian island in Väinameri Sea, and has size of 3,52 ha. It forms Sipelgarahu Nature Reserve in Matsalu National Park.

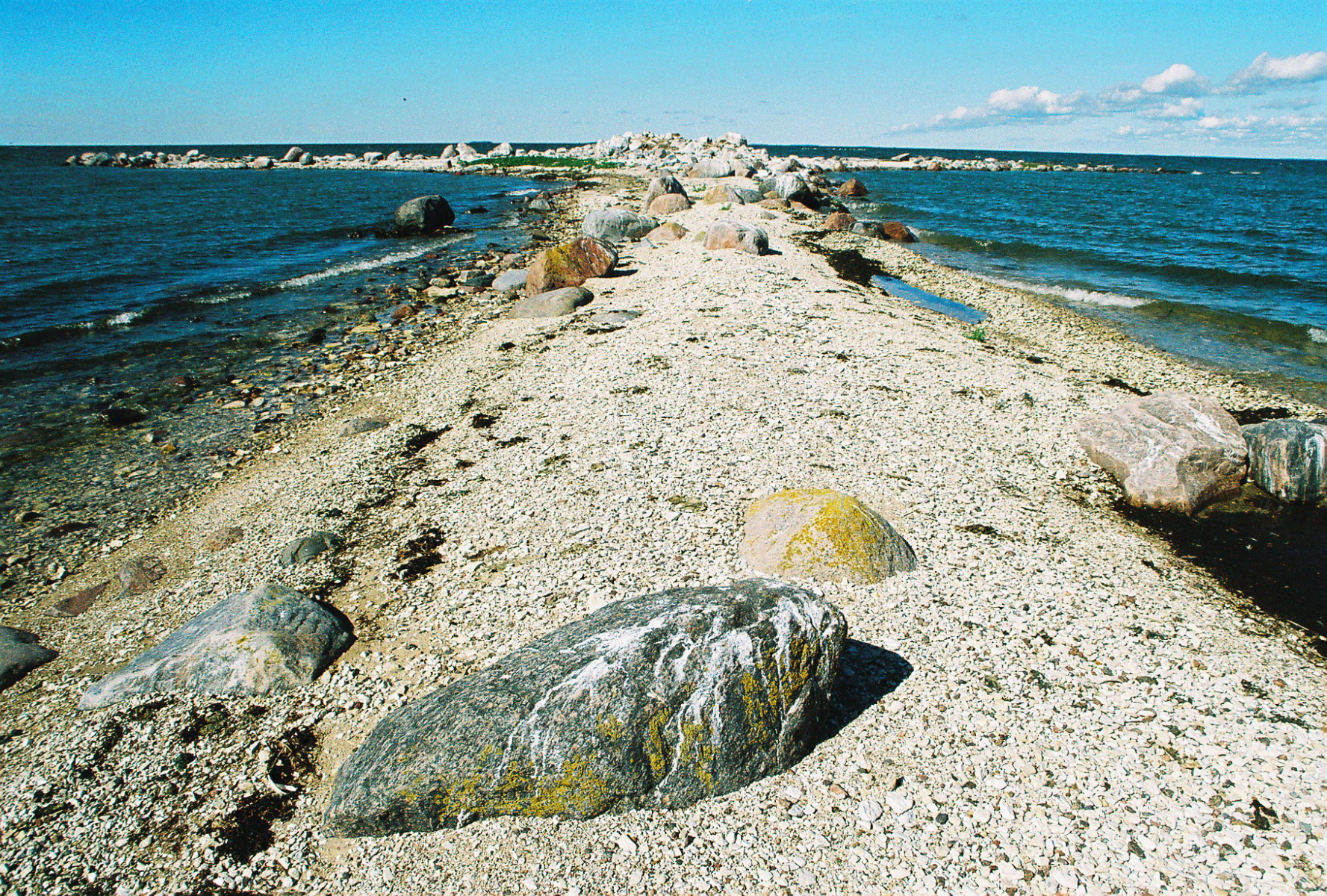
Sipelgarahu in Matsalu National Park, Lääne County, Estonia

== Location ==
The island is located in Lääne County, in the urban municipality of Haapsalu, as part of village of Puise. It lies 1 km south-west of Kumari Laid, 10 km north-east of Seanina at the northern tip of Muhu, 7 km west of Puise's nose on the mainland and 7.5 km east of Kõverlaiul, the easternmost point of Hiiu County.

== Fauna and flora ==
Island's geology, consisting of sand and rocks, prevents flora from developing.

Island is a nesting place for Great cormorant.

== Human activity ==
Economic activities, use of natural resources and human presence are prohibited in Sipelgarahu Nature Reserve and in 500-metre-wide water area around island. Exception to it are actions of scientific research, surveillance and rescue work.

== See also ==
List of islands of Estonia
