= Bay of Winds =

Body of water in Queen Mary Land, Antarctica

- Coordinates: 66°30′S 97°35′E

The Bay of Winds is a coastal embayment between Cape Dovers and Avalanche Rocks in Antarctica. It was discovered by the Western Base Party of the Australasian Antarctic Expedition, 1911–14, under Mawson, who so named it because of the almost constant outflow of cold dense air from the plateau into the bay.
