= Joseph M. Baldwin =

Australian astronomer

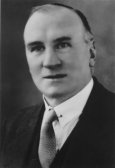

Joseph Mason Baldwin (9 September 1878 – 6 July 1945) was Victorian government astronomer 1920–1943.

Baldwin was born in Carlton, Melbourne, Australia, the third son of Joseph Baldwin (d.1887) and his wife Emma Maria, née Graham. J.M. Baldwin's maternal grandfather was astronomer Andrew Graham who was involved in his grandson's training.

Baldwin received his professional education at the University of Melbourne in the state of Victoria, Australia from 1896 to 1913, where he received two Bachelor's, a Master's and lastly a Doctor of Science degree.

He was chief assistant at the Melbourne Observatory from 1908, acting Director from 1915 and served as government astronomer in the state of Victoria from 1920 to 1943.

Baldwin was president, Royal Society of Victoria 1925–26; president, Section A, Australian and New Zealand Association for the Advancement of Science 1930-31 and fellow of the Royal Astronomical Society.

Baldwin became acquainted with the work of Edward J. Nanson, a professor of mathematics at the University of Melbourne, and wrote an article describing an elimination method for the Borda count based on Nanson's research.(1) This method is referred to as Baldwin's method.

Baldwin Rocks are named after him.

== Footnotes ==
1. The technique of the Nanson preferential majority system of election. Proceedings of the Royal Society of Victoria. n.s.39; pp. 42–52. (1926)

Joseph M. Baldwin in libraries (WorldCat catalog)
