= Hülgerahu =

Island in Estonia

Coordinates: 58°48′38″N 22°59′37″E

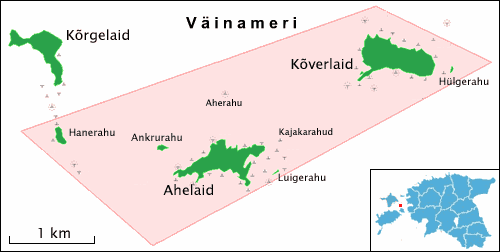
Map of the Laidelahe special protection zone of the Hiiumaa plateau landscape protection area including Hülgerahu

Hülgerahu is a small, uninhabited, moraine-based Baltic Sea island belonging to the country of Estonia.

Hülgerahu covers approximately 0.15 hectares and lies just off the eastern coast of the larger island Kõverlaid.

The island belongs to both Hiiumaa Islets Landscape Reserve and the Laidelaht Wilderness Area and is closed to the public. Its beaches are an important breeding ground for birds and marine mammals such as grey seals.
