= Kennedy Peak (Antarctica) =

Mountain peak in Queen Mary Land, Antarctica

Kennedy Peak (67°13′S 99°11′E) is a small peak protruding above the continental ice 2 nautical miles (4 km) south of Mount Barr Smith, on the west side of Denman Glacier, Antarctica. It was mapped from air photos taken by U.S. Navy Operation Highjump, 1946–47, and named by the Advisory Committee on Antarctic Names (US-ACAN) for A.L. Kennedy, a cartographer with the Australasian Antarctic Expedition Western Base party, in recognition of the close correlation of his 1912–13 running survey of the eastern half of the Queen Mary Coast with the US-ACAN map of 1955 compiled from aerial photographs.
