= S. K. Tressler =

Pakistani politician

Shushil Kumar Tressler is a Pakistani Christian and former government minister.

== Early life ==
He was born in Sialkot, Pakistan. He joined the Pakistan Military Academy in 1955.

== Career ==
He rose to the rank of lieutenant colonel.

He then joined the foreign service. He served as chief of protocol for a while and then was appointed chairman of the National Council of Social Welfare.

He was the director general of Pakistan's Foreign Service Academy from March to September 1994.

In 2001, he was appointed as minister of culture, sports, tourism and youth affairs, and minorities. He was the only Christian in the cabinet.

== Recognition ==
Tressler was awarded Sitara-i-Imtiaz (Military) for his service to the country.

He was chief guest at a memorial meeting convened by History and Archaeology Association to observe the 750th death anniversary of the great mystic poet of Sindh, Lal Shahbaz Qalandar.

Tressler chaired a seminar ‘Role of Civil Society in 21st century’ organized by Department of Communication and Media studies at Fatima Jinnah Women University in collaboration with the Human Rights and Minorities Department to mark International Human Rights Day.
