= Farr Bay =

Body of water in Queen Mary Land, Antarctica

- Coordinates: 66°35′S 94°23′E

Farr Bay is a bay 7 miles (11 km) wide on the coast of Antarctica, lying just east of Helen Glacier. It was discovered in November 1912 by the Western Base party of the Australasian Antarctic Expedition under Mawson. In some early reports the feature was called "Depot Bay". It was later named by Mawson for Dr. C.C. Farr of New Zealand, a member of the Expedition Advisory Committee.
