= Cape Moyes =

Headland in Antarctica

Cape Moyes (66°35′S 96°25′E) is an ice-covered headland fronting on the Shackleton Ice Shelf, 18 nautical miles (33 km) west of Cape Dovers. It was discovered by the Australasian Antarctic Expedition (AAE) under Mawson, 1911–1914, and named by him for Morton H. Moyes, meteorologist with the AAE Western Base party.
