= Wright Bay =

Body of water in Queen Mary Land, Antarctica

- Coordinates: 66°34′S 93°37′E

Wright Bay is a small bay formed between the west side of Helen Glacier Tongue and the mainland. Discovered by the Australasian Antarctic Expedition (1911–14) under Douglas Mawson, who named it for Charles S. Wright of Scott's Terra Nova expedition (1910–13).
