= Cape Peremennyy =

Ice point on the coast of Antarctica

Cape Peremennyy (66°12′S 105°24′E) is an ice point on the coast of Antarctica 45 miles west-northwest of Merritt Island. It is on the Knox Coast of Wilkes Land.

It was first mapped in 1955 by Gardner Dean Blodgett from aerial photographs taken by USN Operation Highjump (1947), and then photographed by the Soviet Antarctic Expedition and ANARE (Australian National Antarctic Research Expeditions) (1956). It was named at the suggestion of members of the Soviet expedition.

Peremennyy means "variable" and probably refers to the nature of this ice coastline.
