= Yorick (programming language) =

- Designed by: David H. Munro
- First appeared: 1996; 30 years ago
- Stable release: 2.2.04 / May 2015; 11 years ago
- OS: Unix-like systems including macOS, Microsoft Windows
- License: BSD
- Filename extensions: .i
- Website: github.com/LLNL/yorick

Yorick is an interpreted programming language designed for numerics, graph plotting, and steering large scientific simulation codes. It is quite fast due to array syntax, and extensible via C or Fortran routines. It was created in 1996 by David H. Munro of Lawrence Livermore National Laboratory.

== Features ==
=== Indexing ===
Yorick can manipulate elements in N-dimensional arrays conveniently, with its powerful syntax.

Several elements can be accessed all at once:

> x=[1,2,3,4,5,6];
> x
[1,2,3,4,5,6]
> x(3:6)
[3,4,5,6]
> x(3:6:2)
[3,5]
> x(6:3:-2)
[6,4]

Arbitrary elements

> x=[[1,2,3],[4,5,6]]
> x
[[1,2,3],[4,5,6]]
> x([2,1],[1,2])
[[2,1],[5,4]]
> list=where(1<x)
> list
[2,3,4,5,6]
> y=x(list)
> y
[2,3,4,5,6]

Pseudo-index

Like "threading" in PDL and "broadcasting" in Numpy, Yorick has a mechanism to do this:

> x=[1,2,3]
> x
[1,2,3]
> y=[[1,2,3],[4,5,6]]
> y
[[1,2,3],[4,5,6]]
> y(-,)
[[[1],[2],[3]],[[4],[5],[6]]]
> x(-,)
[[1],[2],[3]]
> x(,-)
[[1,2,3]]
> x(,-)/y
[[1,1,1],[0,0,0]]
> y=[[1.,2,3],[4,5,6]]
> x(,-)/y
[[1,1,1],[0.25,0.4,0.5]]

Rubber index

".." is a rubber-index to represent zero or more dimensions of the array.

> x=[[1,2,3],[4,5,6]]
> x
[[1,2,3],[4,5,6]]
> x(..,1)
[1,2,3]
> x(1,..)
[1,4]
> x(2,..,2)
5

"*" is a kind of rubber-index to reshape a slice (sub-array) of an array to a vector.

> x(*)
[1,2,3,4,5,6]

Tensor multiplication

Tensor multiplication is done as follows in Yorick:

P(,+, )*Q(, +)

means $\sum_{j=1}^{j=N}{P_{ijkl}Q_{mnj}}$

> x=[[1,2,3],[4,5,6]]
> x
[[1,2,3],[4,5,6]]
> y=[[7,8],[9,10],[11,12]]
> x(,+)*y(+,)
[[39,54,69],[49,68,87],[59,82,105]]
> x(+,)*y(,+)
[[58,139],[64,154]]
