= Pobeda Ice Island =

Pobeda Ice Island, original Russian name остров Победы (остров = Island, Победа = Victory, meaning 'Pobeda Island' or 'Victory Island'), is an ice island in the Mawson Sea. It is located 160 km (99 mi) off the coast of Queen Mary Land, East Antarctica. This island, which exists periodically, is formed by the running aground of a tabular iceberg.

== Periodic formation ==
The ice island is created and vanishes periodically. It is created by the calving of an enormous block of ice from Denman Glacier, located in the eastern part of Shackleton Ice Shelf. The resulting tabular iceberg drifts northwest until it runs aground upon a shoal north of the ice shelf. The iceberg remains locked there in this position for a decade or more, until it has remodeled enough to free itself from the shoal. It then drifts into the open ocean, where it breaks into fragments. These iceberg fragments eventually melt as they drift into warmer waters. The floating tongue of the Denman Glacier, fed by ice from the interior of Antarctica, advances until a new large berg is calved about every 40 to 50 years.

== Data ==
Pobeda Ice Island is variable in its dimensions, but is commonly up to 70 km (43 mi) long and 36 km (22 mi) wide, with an area of 1,500 km^{2} (579 sq mi). Laws of physics dictate that 11% of an iceberg will extend above the water level (in salt water), while the remainder will be submerged. In the case of Pobeda Ice Island, whose flat surface is roughly 27 meters (89 ft) above sea level, this means that the iceberg extends to a depth of roughly 216 meters (709 ft) below sea level, and its total height is approximately 243 meters (797 ft). The further implication is that the ocean floor is also roughly 216 meters (709 ft) below sea level, at the point of the shoal.

The term "island" is technically incorrect, since this geographic feature is in reality a tabular iceberg with nearly vertical sides and a flat top.

== History ==
At this position, an ice island was first sighted by the United States Exploring Expedition, led by Charles Wilkes, in February 1840. It prevented his westward passage around the Antarctic coast, and he named it Termination Land. Douglas Mawson later renamed the island Termination Ice Tongue when he encountered it on the 1911–1913 Australasian Antarctic Expedition. No island was noted however at that location, when he returned during his 1929–1931 BANZARE expedition.

A Soviet expedition came across the island in 1960 and renamed it again, this time as Pobeda Ice Island, named for Soviet victory over the Axis powers in the Great Patriotic War. They even established a temporary research station on the island, which existed between 9 May and 12 August 1960, alongside a few other stations named Mir on Drygalski Island and Druzhba on Zavadovsky Cupola, West Ice Shelf. The station was worked on by three people under meteorologist B. A. Deryugin, and it was supported by two KAPSh-1 (КАПШ-1) pavilions. There were also two radio stations and a standby radio station which was powered by a manually operated generator. During this time, the island is described to be around 60 km (37 mi) long and 25–30 km (16–19 mi) wide, with an average height of about 40 m (130 ft).

Pobeda disappeared sometime in the 1970s, to be replaced by a new berg that calved in 1985. This too disappeared in 2003–2004. And, as of 2021, there was no ice island at this location.

== Pobeda Canyon ==
About 200 km (120 mi) north of Pobeda Ice Island lies Pobeda Canyon, an oceanic trench so named in 1956 by A. P. Lizitsin during his 1st Soviet Antarctic Expedition on its ship RV Ob. It is located between 62°30′S 100°15′E and 64°30′S 097°35′E.

== See also ==
- List of Antarctic islands south of 60° S
- Thwaites Iceberg Tongue

== Literature ==
- Bernard Stonehouse: Encyclopedia of Antarctica and the Southern Oceans. Wiley, Chichester/Hoboken 2002, ISBN 0-471-98665-8, S. 200
