= Bowman Island =

Island in Antarctica

- Location within Antarctica

Geography
- Location: Antarctica
- Coordinates: 65°16′48″S 103°6′36″E
- Area: 186 km^{2} (72 sq mi)
- Length: 39 km (24.2 mi)
- Width: 10 km (6 mi)

Administration
- Administered under the Antarctic Treaty System

Demographics
- Population: Uninhabited

Bowman Island is a high ice-covered island, about 39 kilometres (24 mi) long and from 3 to 10 kilometres (2 to 6 mi) wide, shaped like a figure eight. Bowman Island is located at 65°16′48″S 103°6′36″E. Bowman Island rises above the northeastern part of Shackleton Ice Shelf, which partially encloses the island, 40 kilometres (25 mi) northeast of Cape Elliott. Discovered on January 28, 1931, by British Australian and New Zealand Antarctic Research Expedition (BANZARE) under Sir Douglas Mawson, who named it for Isaiah Bowman, then Director of the American Geographical Society.

== See also ==
- Composite Antarctic Gazetteer
- List of Antarctic islands south of 60° S
- SCAR
- Territorial claims in Antarctica
