= David H. Munro =

American physicist (born 1955)

- Born: David Herbert Munro; April 29, 1955 (age 71); Oakland, California
- Education: California Institute of Technology (1976 BS); Massachusetts Institute of Technology (1980 Ph.D.)
- Scientific career
- Fields: Plasma physics
- Workplaces: Lawrence Livermore National Laboratory
- Thesis: The Production of Sound by Moving Objects (1980)
- Doctoral advisor: Dr. K. Uno Ingard

David Herbert Munro (born April 29, 1955) is a physicist at Lawrence Livermore National Laboratory (LLNL) who created the programming language Yorick as well as the scientific graphics library Gist.

Munro earned his BS at Caltech (1976) and PhD at the Massachusetts Institute of Technology (1980). He joined LLNL in 1980 and has primarily focused his research on laser fusion.

He received the Excellence in Plasma Physics award of the American Physical Society in 1995 and was elected a Fellow of the American Physical Society in 2001 "For his seminal contributions to the design of laser-driven Rayleigh-Taylor experiments, and to the analysis and design of shock-timing experiments for cryogenic inertial confinement fusion targets".
