= Apfel Glacier =

Glacier in Antarctica

- Location within Antarctica
- Location: Queen Mary Land
- Coordinates: 66°25′S 100°35′E
- Length: 5 nmi (9 km; 6 mi)
- Thickness: unknown
- Terminus: Edisto Ice Tongue
- Status: unknown

Apfel Glacier (66°25′S 100°35′E) is a glacier about 5 nautical miles (10 km) wide and 20 nautical miles (40 km) long, flowing west-northwest along the south flank of the Bunger Hills and terminating in Edisto Ice Tongue. It was mapped from air photos taken by U.S. Navy Operation Highjump, 1946–47, and named by the Advisory Committee on Antarctic Names for Earl T. Apfel, professor of geology at Syracuse University, who served as geologist with the U.S. Navy Operation Windmill parties, 1947–48, which established astronomical control stations along Queen Mary, Knox and Budd Coasts.

== See also ==
- List of glaciers in the Antarctic
- Glaciology
