= Jist =

Jist or JIST may refer to:

- The Jist, a Norwegian experimental jazz duo
- Jorhat Institute of Science and Technology, Jorhat, Assam, India
- JIST Publishing (Job Information, Seeking and Training), an imprint of the New Mountain Learning publishing company
- JWST IV & V Simulation and Test (JIST), a software simulation for the Spacecraft bus (JWST)

== See also ==
- Gist (disambiguation)
