= Mount Strathcona =

Mountain in Queen Mary Land, Antarctica

Mount Strathcona (67°22′S 99°11′E) is a mountain, 1,380 m high, rising above the continental ice on the west side of Denman Glacier, 11 miles south of Mount Barr Smith, in Antarctica. It was discovered by the Australasian Antarctic Expedition under Douglas Mawson, 1911–14, and named by him for Lord Strathcona, High Commissioner for Canada in 1911, a patron of the expedition.
