= Delay Point =

Rocky bluff in Queen Mary Land, Antarctica

Delay Point (66°27′S 98°15′E) is a rocky bluff rising to 185 metres (600 ft) on the west side of Melba Peninsula, about 6 nautical miles (11 km) west of Cape Charcot. It was discovered by the Australasian Antarctic Expedition under Mawson, 1911–14, and so named by the Eastern Sledge Party of the Western Base because bad weather delayed the party near here for several days in November 1912.
