= Bentley Subglacial Trench =

Subglacial trench in Antarctica

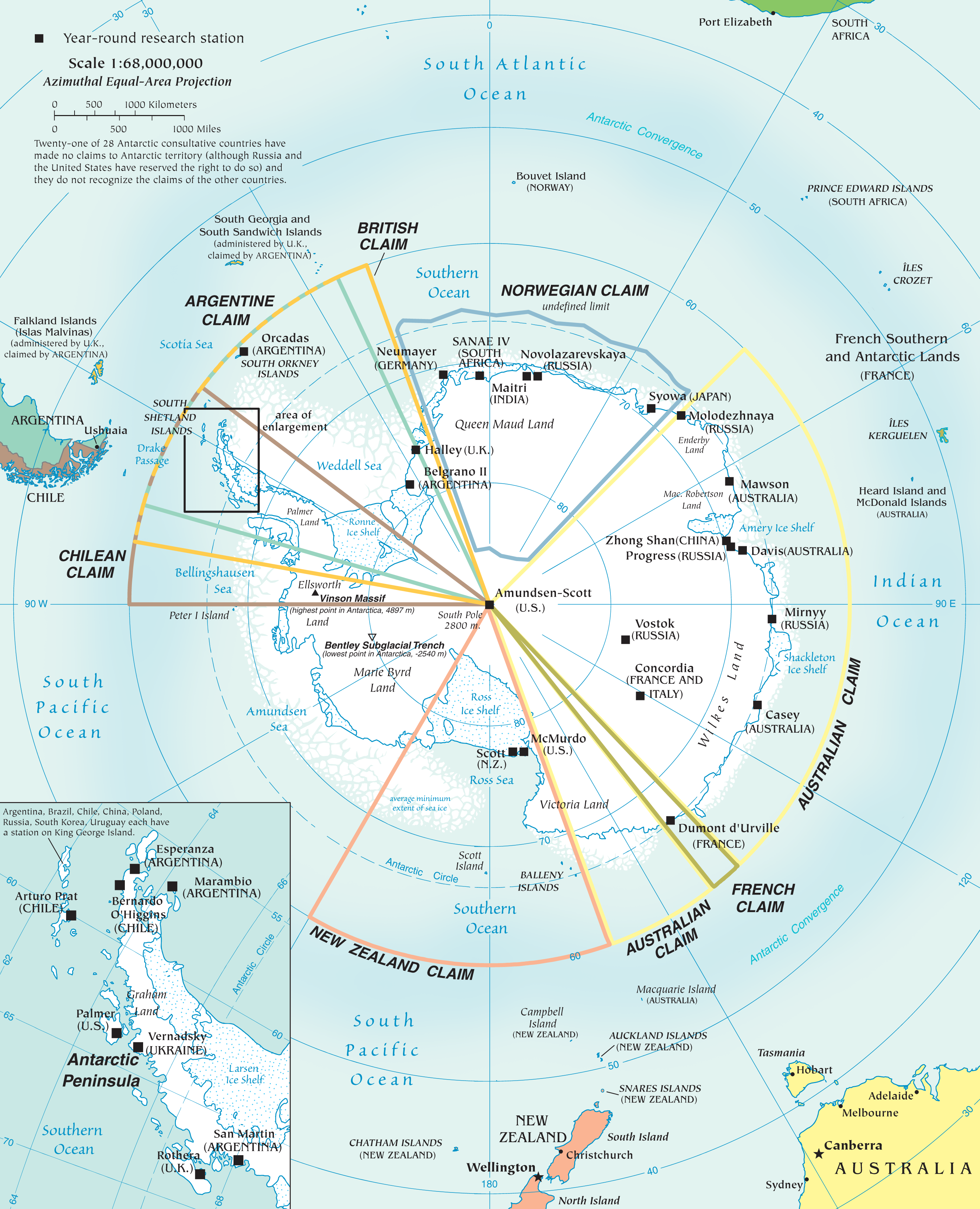

The Bentley Subglacial Trench is a vast topographic trench in Marie Byrd Land, West Antarctica, 80°S, 115°W. At 2,555 meters (8,382 ft) below sea level, it (along with the deepest points within the adjacent Byrd Subglacial Basin) is among the lowest points on the surface of the Earth not covered by ocean, although it is covered by ice. (See Extremes on Earth and Vestfold Hills).

The trench was named in 1961 after Charles R. Bentley, who was the geophysicist in charge of the scientific expeditions in West Antarctica in 1957–59 that led to its discovery.

In 2016, some hot anomalies were detected beneath Bentley Subglacial Trench and Mount Sidley volcano.

== See also ==
- Extreme points of Antarctica
- Extremes on Earth
- Extreme points of Earth
- Vestfold Hills
- West Antarctic Rift System
- Jacobshavn Isbræ
- Denman Glacier
