= Byrd Subglacial Basin =

Subglacial basin In Antarctica

Byrd Subglacial Basin (80°S 115°W) is a major subglacial basin of West Antarctica, extending east–west between the Crary Mountains and the Ellsworth Mountains. It is bounded to the south by a low subglacial ridge which separates this feature from Bentley Subglacial Trench. A crude delineation of this subglacial basin was determined by several U.S. seismic parties operating from Byrd Station, Little America V, and Ellsworth Station during the 1950s and 1960s. It was named by the Advisory Committee on Antarctic Names (1961) for its locus relative to Marie Byrd Land and Byrd Station.

This revised description, excluding Bentley Subglacial Trench and smaller basins to the south of Flood Range and the Ford Ranges, follows delineation of the region by the Scott Polar Research Institute–National Science Foundation–Technical University of Denmark airborne radio echo sounding program, 1967–79.

== Lowest Depth on Earth ==
On March 8, 2013, the British Antarctic Survey reported on the creation of Bedmap2, the most detailed map of Antarctica's landmass to date. It showed for the first time the true depth of Byrd Subglacial Basin: 2,870 meters below sea level. This makes Byrd Subglacial Basin the lowest point on any of the Earth's continental plates. However, because of the glacier sitting on the basin, this point is ultimately unreachable.
