= BedMachine Antarctica =

Research project

BedMachine Antarctica is a project to map the sub-surface landmass below the ice of Antarctica using data from radar depth sounding and ice shelf bathymetry methods and computer analysis of that data based on the conservation of mass.

The project uses data from 19 research institutes. It is led by the University of California, Irvine.

It has revealed that the Antarctic bedrock is the deepest natural location on land (or at least not under liquid water) worldwide, with the bedrock being 3,500 m (11,500 ft) below sea level.
