= Gist (graphics software) =

Scientific graphics library written in C by David H. Munro

== General ==
For scientific plotting applications, Gist is a scientific graphics library written in C by David H. Munro of Lawrence Livermore National Laboratory. It supports three graphics output devices: X Window, PostScript, and Computer Graphics Metafiles (CGM). The library is promoted as being small (written directly to Xlib), efficient, and full featured. Portability is restricted to systems running X Window (essentially, the Unix world).

=== Python variant ===
There is a Python port of Gist called PyGist; it is used as one of several optional graphics front ends of the scientific library SciPy. PyGist is also ported to Mac OS and Microsoft Windows.
