= Roscoe Promontory =

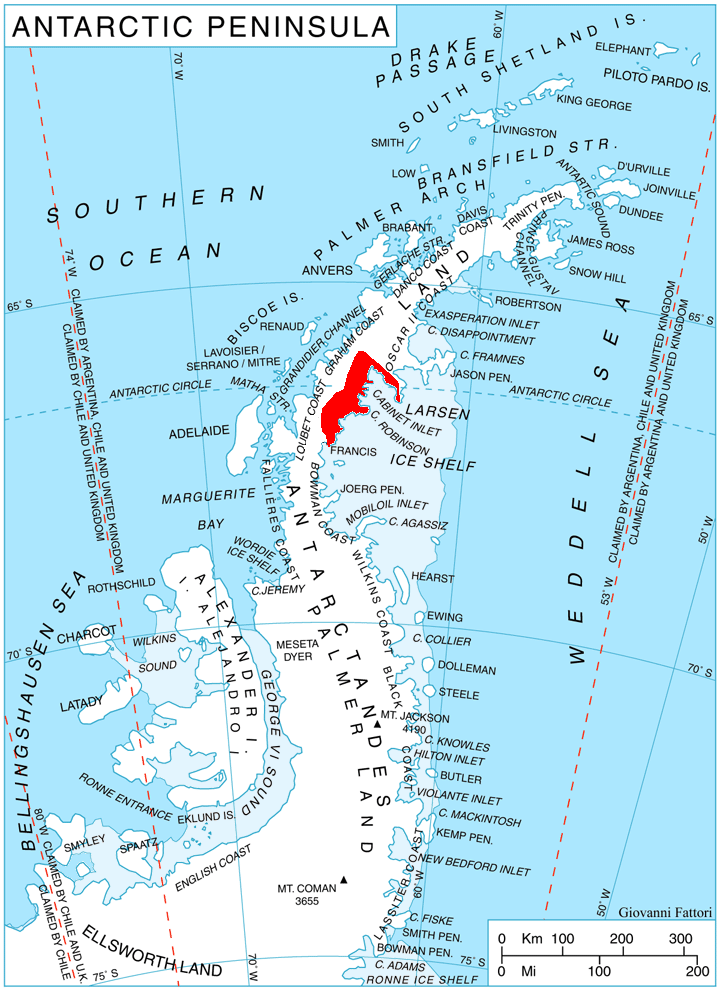
Location of Foyn Coast on Antarctic Peninsula.

Roscoe Promontory (66°52′S 64°27′W) is a massive ice-capped promontory between Aagaard Glacier and Mitterling Glacier on the north side of Mill Inlet, Foyn Coast, Graham Land. The feature was photographed by Ronne Antarctic Research Expedition (RARE) and surveyed by Falkland Islands Dependencies Survey (FIDS) in 1947. Named by Advisory Committee on Antarctic Names (US-ACAN) in 1987 after John H. Roscoe, photogrammetrist on U.S. Navy Operation Highjump, 1946–47, and Operation Windmill, 1947–48; author of Antarctic Bibliography, U.S. Naval Photographic Interpretation Center, Department of the Navy, 1951, and Antarctica, Regional Photo Interpretation Series, Department of the Air Force, 1953. The promontory is in proximity to several features named after Antarctic bibliographers.
