= Gist (surname) =

Gist is a surname. Notable people with the surname include:

- Asante Gist (born 1997), American basketball player
- Carole Gist (born 1969), first African American woman to win the Miss USA title
- Christopher Gist (1706–1759), one of the first white explorers of the Ohio Country in what would become the United States
- Eloyce King Patrick Gist (1892–1974), American film director and producer
- George Gist, English name of Sequoyah (c.1770–1843), Native American silversmith and inventor of a Cherokee syllabary
- James Gist (born 1986), American professional basketball player
- Joseph Gist (1775–1836), U.S. Representative from South Carolina
- Kenneth Gist Jr. (1946–2018), birth name of Kenny O'Dell, American country music singer and songwriter
- Keir Lamont Gist (born 1969), birth name of KayGee, American DJ
- Mordecai Gist (1743–1792), Continental Army general during the American Revolutionary War
- Nathaniel Gist (1733-1812?), American colonel in the American Revolutionary War, reputed father of the Native American leader Sequoyah, son of Christopher Gist
- Robert Gist (1924–1998), American actor and film director
- Samuel Gist (1717 or 1723-1815), English-born colonial Virginia slave owner who made provisions to free his slaves in his will
- States Rights Gist (1831–1864), lawyer, militia general and Confederate Army general in the American Civil War
- Steve Gist, American politician
- William Henry Gist (1807–1874), 68th Governor of South Carolina and a leader of the secession movement in South Carolina
