= Watson Bluff =

Bluff in Queen Mary Land, Antarctica

Coordinates: 66°25′S 98°57′E

Watson Bluff () is a dark bluff 225 m, at the east end of David Island. Discovered by the Australasian Antarctic Expedition, 1911–14, under Mawson, and named for Andrew D. Watson, geologist with the expedition.
