= David Island =

Island in Queen Mary Land, Antarctica

David Island (66°25′S 98°46′E) is an ice-covered island, 10 miles (16 km) long and 6 miles (10 km) wide, marked by rock exposures along its north and east sides, lying off Davis Peninsula in the Shackleton Ice Shelf in Antarctica. It was discovered in November 1912 by the Western Base party of the Australasian Antarctic Expedition (AAE) under Douglas Mawson. Mawson named the island for Edgeworth David, a member of the AAE Advisory Committee.

== See also ==
- Baldwin Rocks
- List of antarctic and sub-antarctic islands
