= National Council of Social Welfare =

National Council of Social Welfare is an advisory body on social welfare to the Government of Pakistan established through a resolution in 1956.
