= Junction Corner =

Mainland meeting point on Shackleton Ice Shelf

Junction Corner (66°30′S 94°41′E) is the junction point of the mainland with the west side of Shackleton Ice Shelf. It was discovered and named by the Australasian Antarctic Expedition, 1911–14, under Mawson.
