= Melba Peninsula =

Peninsula in Queen Mary Land, Antarctica

Coordinates: 66°31′S 98°18′E

Melba Peninsula is a broad, ice-covered peninsula between Reid Glacier and the Bay of Winds, fronting on Shackleton Ice Shelf, Antarctica. It was discovered by the Australasian Antarctic Expedition under Mawson, 1911–1914, who named it for Dame Nellie Melba of Melbourne, a patron of the expedition.
