= Tressler Bank =

- Submerged bank Tressler Bank (Antarctica)
- Interactive map of Tressler Bank
- Ocean: Southern Ocean

Tressler Bank (65°0′S 95°0′E) is a submarine bank with a least depth of 56 fathoms, extending from about 94 to 96E in the eastern part of the Davis Sea. The bank was sounded by the USS Burton Island and Willis L. Tressler of the U.S. Navy Hydrographic Office. Tressler carried on oceanographic studies in the Antarctic aboard the USS Tressler and was a scientific leader at Wilkes Station in 1958.
