= Hawk Island =

Island in Delaware County, New York, US

- Location within New York Adirondack Park Location within the United States

Geography
- Location: East Branch Delaware River
- Coordinates: 41°59′28″N 75°08′10″W
- Highest elevation: 1,004 ft (306 m)

Administration
- United States
- State: New York
- County: Delaware
- Hamlet: East Branch

Hawk Island is an island in Delaware County, New York. It is located north of East Branch, on the East Branch Delaware River. The east end of the island is located next to the confluence of the Beaver Kill and the West Branch Delaware River.
