= Scott Glacier (Alaska) =

Glacier in Alaska, United States

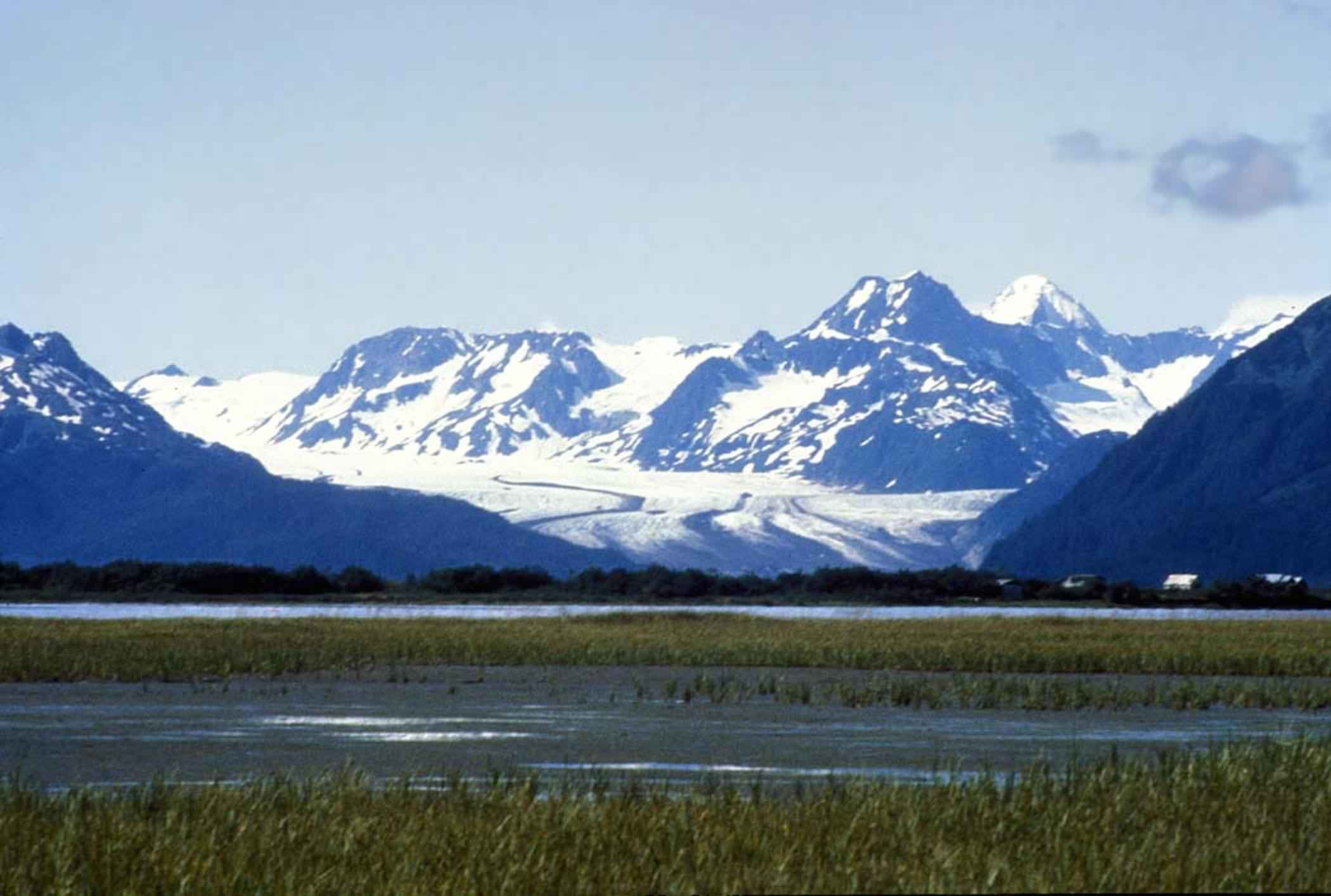

- Location within Alaska
- Interactive map of Scott Glacier
- Type: Mountain glacier
- Location: Valdez-Cordova Census Area, Alaska
- Coordinates: 60°41′46″N 145°10′37″W
- Area: 25 miles^{2} (64 km^{2})
- Length: 15 miles (24 km)
- Lowest elevation: 2,583 ft (787 m)

Scott Glacier is a 15-mile-long (24 km) glacier located in the Chugach Mountains, near Cordova, Alaska. It begins at 60°44′31″N 145°04′20″W and trends southwest to 60°37′11″N 145°23′09″W, 13 miles (21 km) east northeast of Cordova. The Scott Glacier was named in 1908 after a "local miner".

== See also ==
- List of glaciers
