= Mustarahu =

Island in Estonia

Coordinates: 58°48′32.42″N 23°26′29.32″E

Mustarahu is an island belonging to the country of Estonia.

== See also ==
- List of islands of Estonia
