= Kõverlaid =

Island in Estonia

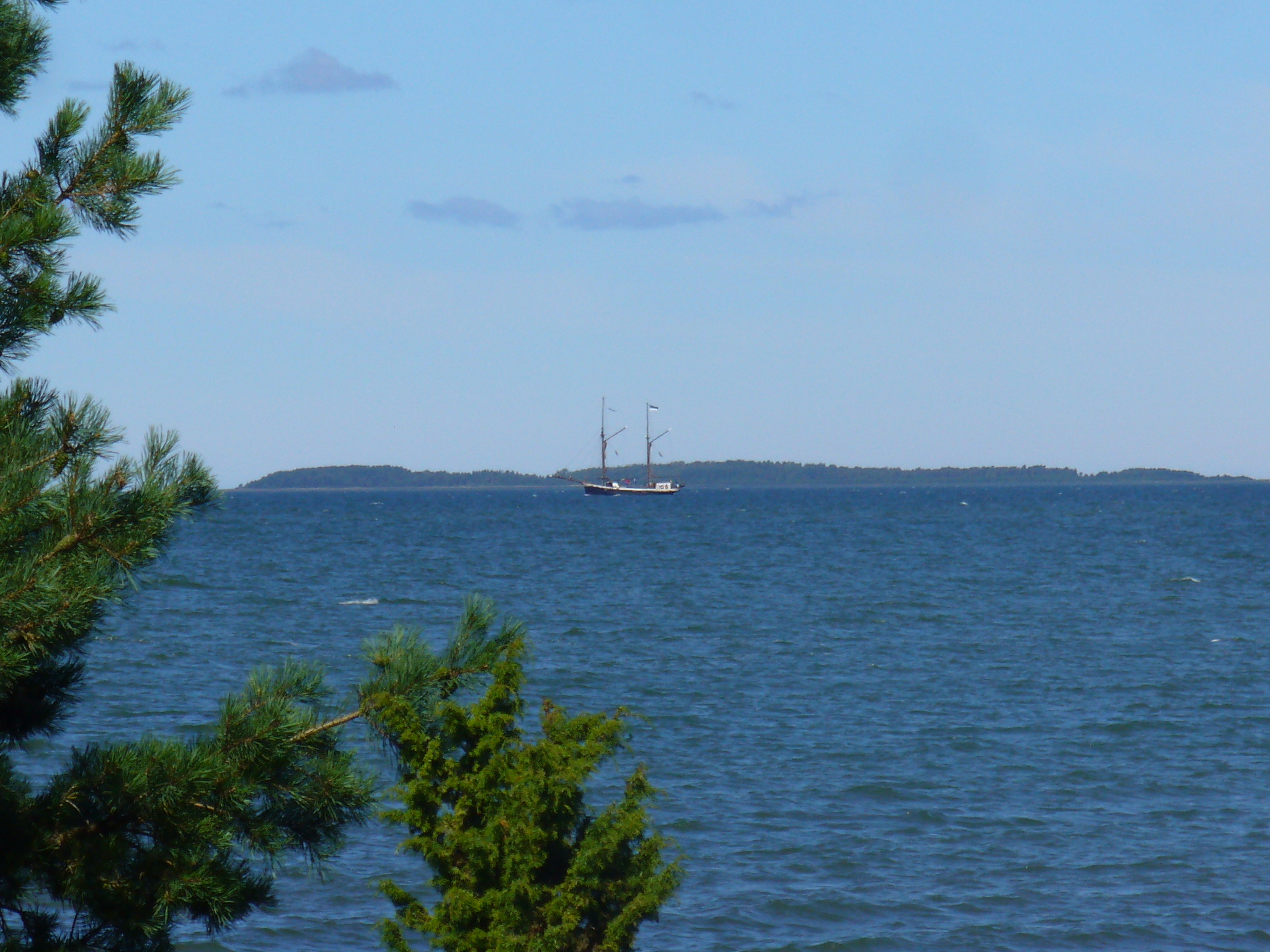
Kõverlaid viewed from the south

Kõverlaid (alternate name: Keverilaid) is a small, moraine-based Baltic Sea island belonging to the country of Estonia. Its coordinates are 58°49′01″N 23°04′46″E.

Kõverlaid covers approximately 29 hectares and lies approximately eleven kilometers from the coast of the island of Hiiumaa, four kilometers west of the island of Kõrgelaid, and approximately three kilometers northwest of the island of Ahelaid in the small Väinameri Sea, or West Estonian archipelago. Kõverlaid is, with a number of small islands and islets, part of the Hiiumaa Islets Nature Reserve (Estonian: Hiiumaa laidude kaitseala). Kõverlaid is administered by Hiiu County.

Despite its small size, the island has numerous flora and fauna; pine, birch and juniper stands are abundant and wild boar, red foxes and moose are found on the island. The island is also an important breeding area for many bird species.

== See also ==
- List of islands of Estonia
