= Mount Barr Smith =

Mountain in Queen Mary Land, Antarctica

Mount Barr Smith (67°10′S 99°12′E) is a striking rock peak, 1,310 m, the northernmost in a line of peaks along the west side of Denman Glacier. Discovered in December 1912 by members of the Western Base party of the Australasian Antarctic Expedition under Mawson, and named by him for Robert Barr Smith of Adelaide, patron of the expedition.
