= Henderson Island (Shackleton Ice Shelf) =

Island in Queen Mary Land, Antarctica

- Location within Antarctica

Geography
- Location: Antarctica
- Coordinates: 66°22′S 97°10′E
- Length: 17 km (10.6 mi)
- Highest elevation: 240 m (790 ft)

Administration
- Administered under the Antarctic Treaty System

Demographics
- Population: Uninhabited

Henderson Island is an ice-covered island 17 kilometres (9 nmi) long and rising to 240 m (787 ft), lying 17 kilometres (9 nmi) southeast of Masson Island within the Shackleton Ice Shelf. Henderson Island was discovered in August 1912 by the Western Base Party of the Australian Antarctic Expedition under Sir Douglas Mawson and named by him for Prof. G. C. Henderson of Adelaide, a member of the Australian Antarctic Expedition Advisory Committee.

== See also ==
- Composite Antarctic Gazetteer
- List of Antarctic and sub-Antarctic islands
- List of Antarctic islands south of 60° S
- SCAR
- Territorial claims in Antarctica

The Quest for Frank Wild by Angie Butler (contains his original memoirs)
