= Western Base party =

1912–1913 exploration Australian group in Antarctica

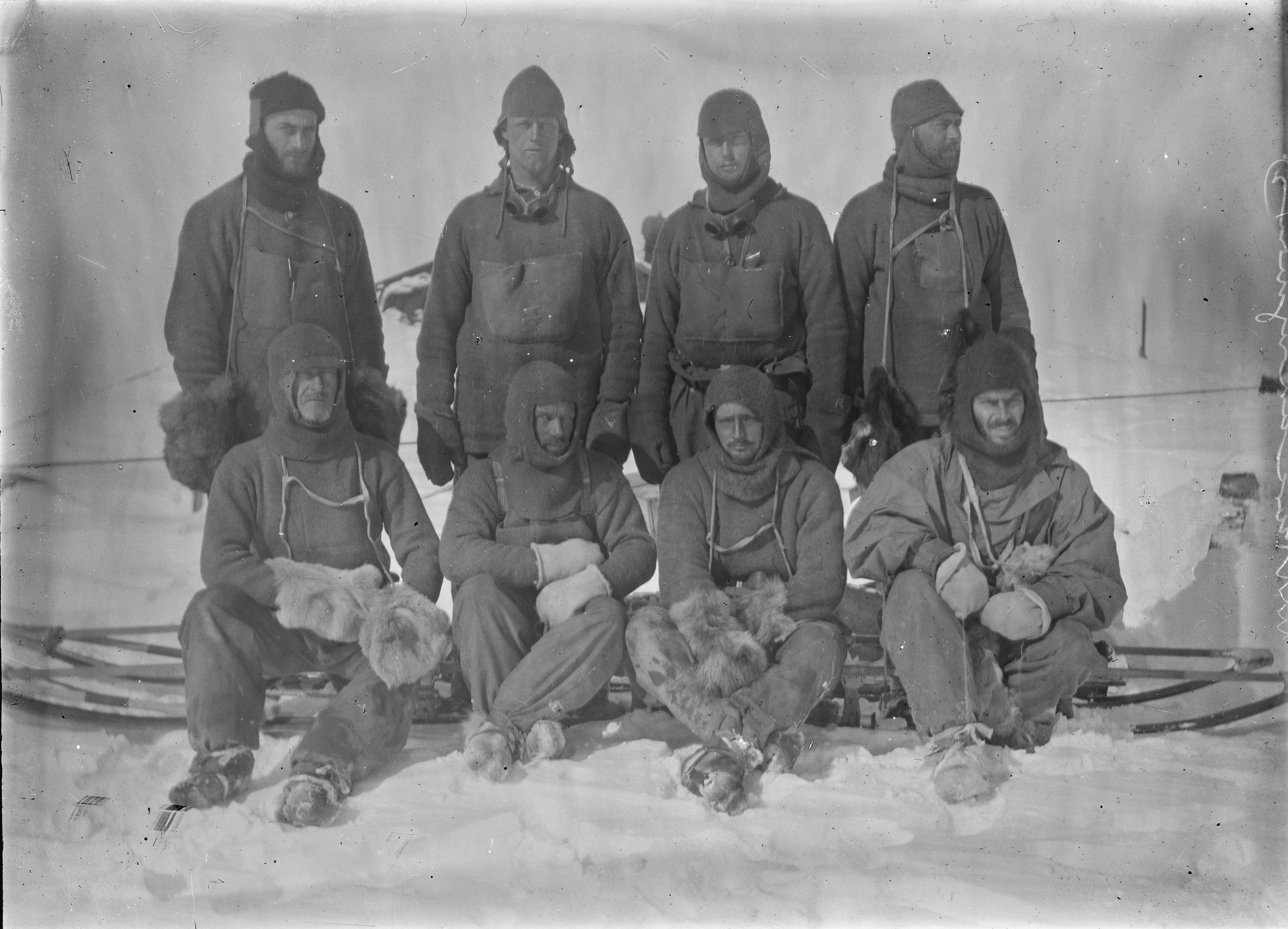
The Western Base Party

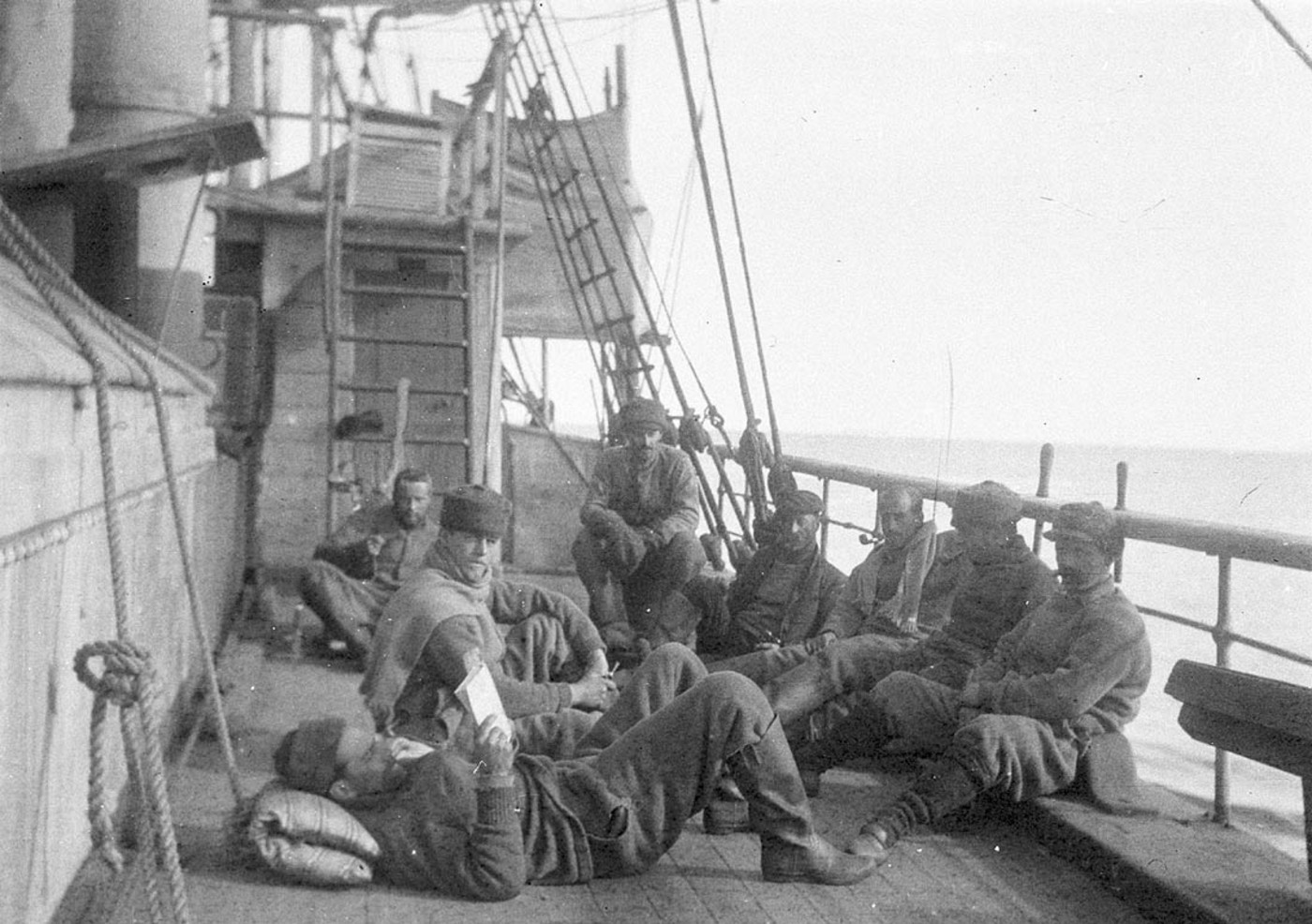
Western Base Party on the SY Aurora's deck (photograph by Percival Gray)

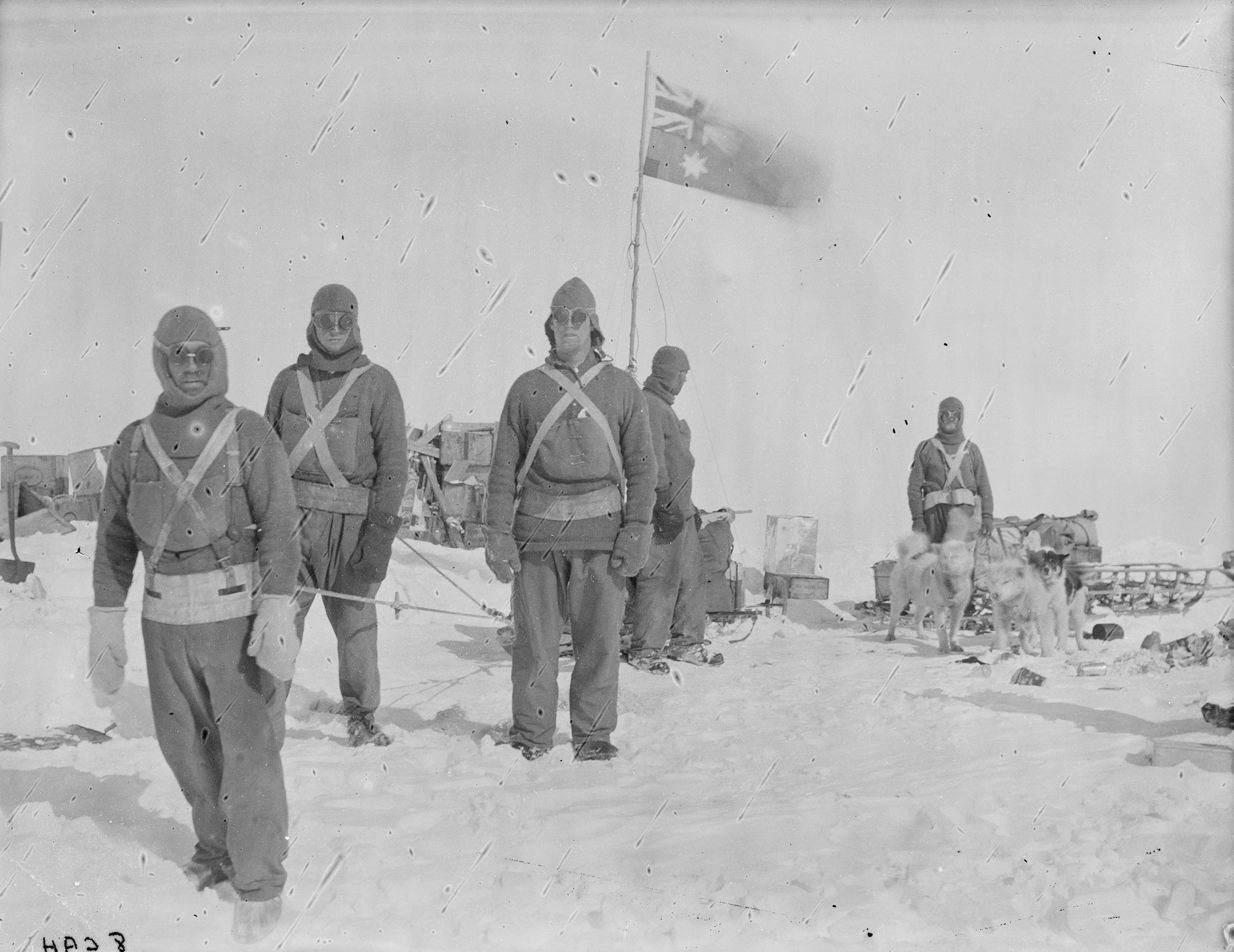
Eastern sledging party setting out from the Grottos, Shackleton Ice Shelf, 1912

The Western Base Party was a successful exploration party of the Australasian Antarctic Expedition. The eight-man Western Party was deposited by the SY Aurora on the Shackleton Ice Shelf at Queen Mary Land. The leader of the team was Frank Wild and the party included the geologist Charles Hoadley.

The party established the Queen Mary Land Station. An early setback was the destruction of the radio mast in the first blizzard. Severe weather impeded activities as did dangerous crevices. The team sent an expedition into Kaiser Wilhelm II Land.

The party had no supplies for a second winter. The Western Base Party was collected on February 23, 1913, by the Aurora, with no loss of life.

== Discoveries ==
The Western Base Party made a number of discoveries including;

- Adams Island
- Bay of Winds
- Cape Penck
- Cape Hoadley
- Cape Hordern
- Denman Glacier
- Pobeda Ice Island
- Farr Bay (discovered in November 1912)
- Henderson Island (discovered in August 1912)
- Hippo Island
- Scott Glacier
- Mount Sandow
- Mount Amundsen

Drygalski Island was first sited by the Western Base Party but it was not until the return voyage of Australasian Antarctic Expedition that the island was accurately identified.

A.L. Kennedy was cartographer of the expedition. He was later honored by the Advisory Committee on Antarctic Names (US-ACAN)'s naming of Kennedy Peak (Antarctica) for him, in recognition of the close correlation of his 1912–13 running survey of the eastern half of the Queen Mary Coast with the US-ACAN map of 1955 compiled from aerial photographs.

== See also ==
- Douglas Mawson
