= Knox Coast =

Segment of coast in Eastern Antarctica

Coordinates: 66°30′S 105°0′E

Location of Knox Coast (red) in Wilkes Land, Australian Antarctic Territory.

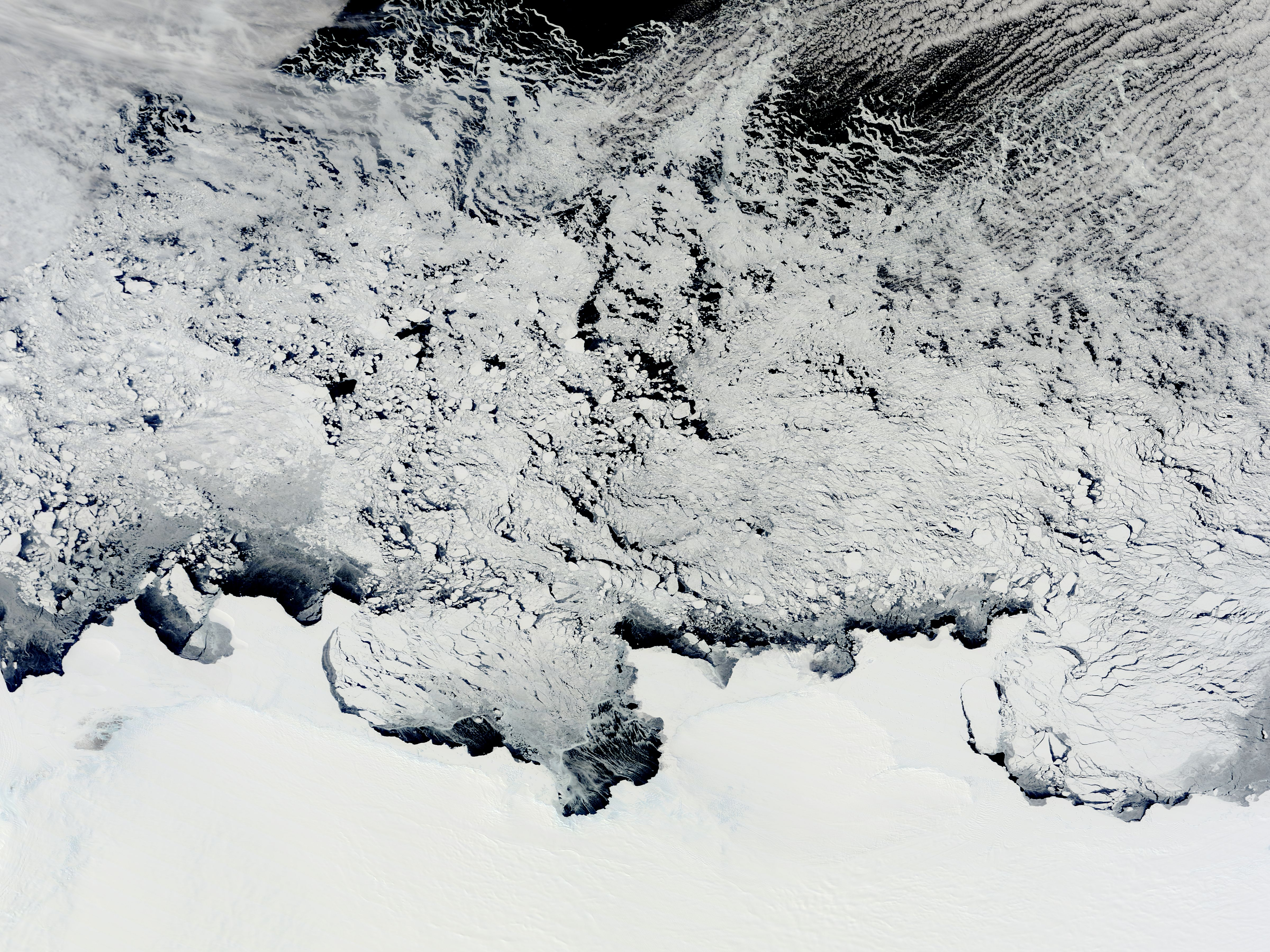
NASA MODIS satellite image of Knox, Budd and Sabrina coasts

Knox Coast, part of Wilkes Land, is that portion of the coast of Antarctica lying between Cape Hordern, at 100°31′E, and the Hatch Islands, at 109°16′E.

== History ==
The coast was discovered in February 1840 by the U.S. Exploring Expedition (1838–42) under Lieutenant Charles Wilkes, and named by Wilkes for Lieutenant Samuel R. Knox, U.S. Navy, captain of the Flying Fish, who served as acting master on the Vincennes during the Antarctic cruise.

== Features ==
Geographic features include:

- Cape Peremennyy
