= Denman Glacier =

Glacier in Queen Mary Land, Antarctica

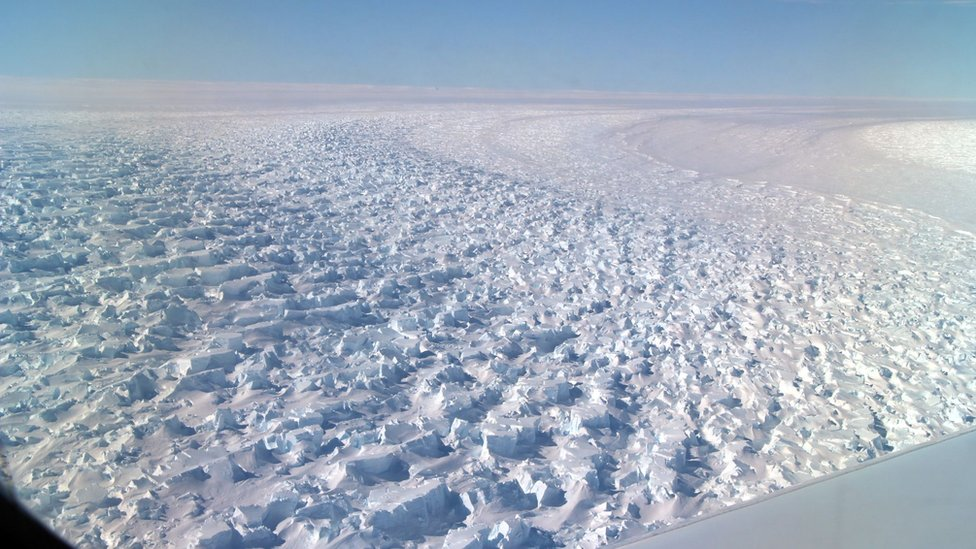
- Photo of Denman Glacier

- Location within Antarctica
- Type: tributary
- Location: Queen Mary Land
- Coordinates: 66°45′S 99°30′E
- Length: 110 km (70 mi)
- Width: 16 km (10 mi)
- Thickness: unknown
- Terminus: Shackleton Ice Shelf
- Status: unknown

Denman Glacier is a glacier that is 11 to 16 km (7 to 10 mi) wide, descending north some 110 km (70 mi), which debouches into the Shackleton Ice Shelf east of David Island, Queen Mary Land. It was discovered in November 1912 by the Western Base party of the Australasian Antarctic Expedition under Sir Douglas Mawson. Mawson named the glacier for Lord Denman, Governor-General of Australia in 1911, a patron of the expedition.

The canyon under Denman Glacier has been found by the BedMachine Antarctica project (under the leadership of the University of California, Irvine) to be the deepest natural location on land (or at least not under liquid water) worldwide, with the bedrock being 3,500 m (11,500 ft) below sea level.

Calving of Denman Glacier into the Mawson Sea gives rise to the periodically appearing Pobeda Ice Island.

== Instability and retreat ==
A 2020 study reported Denman Glacier has retreated 5.4 ± 0.3 km over a 20-year-period from 1996 to 2017–2018. The study projects that the glacier has the potential to undergo a rapid, irreversible retreat, due to the presence of a retrograde bed on the western flank of the glacier and the likely presence of warm water in the sub-ice-shelf cavity. If the entirety of the glacier were hollowed out, it would contribute to a 1.5 m rise in global sea level. However, as there are many factors which will determine the rate of retreat as it continues, such as the narrowness of the channel along which it is occurring and the movement of warm water from the deep ocean, it is difficult to be certain about the fate of the glacier without the collection of more data.

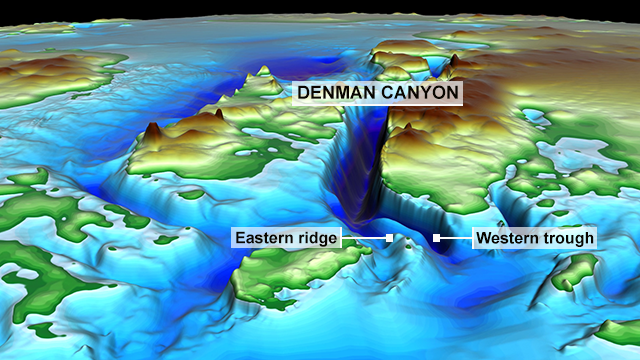
Shape of bedrock under Denman Glacier

Denman represents one of relatively few ice streams that have been identified as requiring special attention in East Antarctica, which has generally been thought of as stable compared to the West Antarctic Ice Sheet. Findings of the instability and retreat of Denman Glacier have contributed to a shift in the perception of change in East Antarctica, along with changes observed at Totten Glacier and glaciers at Vincennes Bay, Porpoise Bay, and the George V Coast.

== See also ==
- Chugunov Island
- Ice stream
- Glaciology
- Kola Superdeep Borehole (deepest artificial point)
- List of Antarctic ice streams
- List of glaciers in the Antarctic
- List of places in Antarctica below sea level
  - Byrd Glacier
  - Bentley Subglacial Trench
- Pobeda Ice Island
