= Scott Glacier (East Antarctica) =

Glacier in Antarctica

- Location within Antarctica
- Location: Queen Mary Land
- Coordinates: 66°30′S 100°20′E
- Length: 20 nmi (37 km; 23 mi)
- Width: 7 nmi (13 km; 8 mi)
- Thickness: unknown
- Terminus: Denman Glacier
- Status: unknown

Scott Glacier (66°30′S 100°20′E) is a glacier, 7 miles (11.3 km) wide and over 20 miles (32 km) long, flowing north-northwest to the Antarctic coast between Denman Glacier and Mill Island. It was discovered by the Western Base Party of the Australasian Antarctic Expedition (1911–1914) under Mawson and named for Capt. Robert F. Scott.

== Mouth ==
=== Cape Hoadley ===
66°28′S 99°56′E. Prominent rock coastal outcrop forming the west portal of the valley occupied by Scott Glacier. Discovered by the Western Base Party of the AAE under Mawson in November 1912, and named by him for C.A. Hoadley, geologist with the Western Base Party. Not: Cape Hoadky.

=== Edisto Ice Tongue ===
66°10′S 100°40′E An ice tongue along the northwest margin of Bunger Hills where it occupies the southwestern portion of Edisto Channel, in the Highjump Archipelago. The ice tongue is a seaward extension of the flow of Apfel Glacier as well as part of the main flow of Scott Glacier. Mapped from air photos taken by USN Operation Highjump, 1946-47. Named by US-ACAN in association with Edisto Channel.

=== Chugunov Island ===
65°54′S 99°29′E. Small ice-covered island, lying at the seaward extremity of Shackleton Ice Shelf, between the projections of Denman and Scott Glaciers. Mapped from aerial photos taken by USN OpHjp, 1946-47. Rephotographed by the Soviet expedition of 1956 and later named for N.A. Chugunov, aerologist who lost his life in the Antarctic in 1958.

== Sources ==
- Alberts, Fred G., ed. (1995), Geographic Names of the Antarctic (PDF) (2 ed.), United States Board on Geographic Names This article incorporates public domain material from websites or documents of the United States Board on Geographic Names.
