= Puise =

Village in Estonia

Coordinates: 58°47′N 23°29′E

- Village
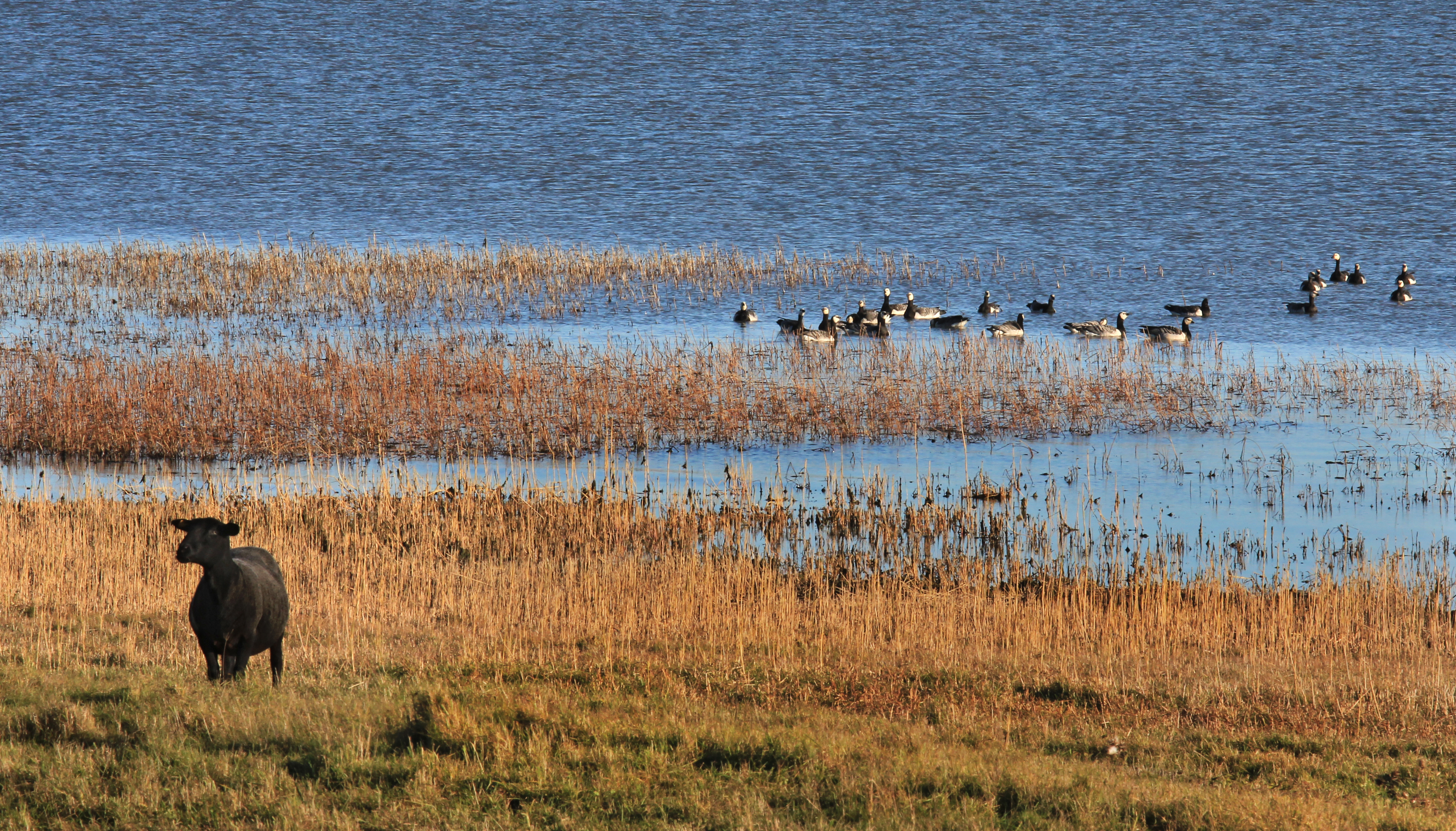
- Sheep and a flock of Barnacle geese in Puise
- Interactive map of Puise
- Country: Estonia
- County: Lääne County
- Municipality: Haapsalu
- Time zone: UTC+2 (EET)
  - Summer (DST): UTC+3 (EEST)

Puise is a village in Haapsalu municipality, Lääne County, in western Estonia. Prior to the 2017 administrative reform of local governments, it was located in Ridala Parish.

== Gallery ==
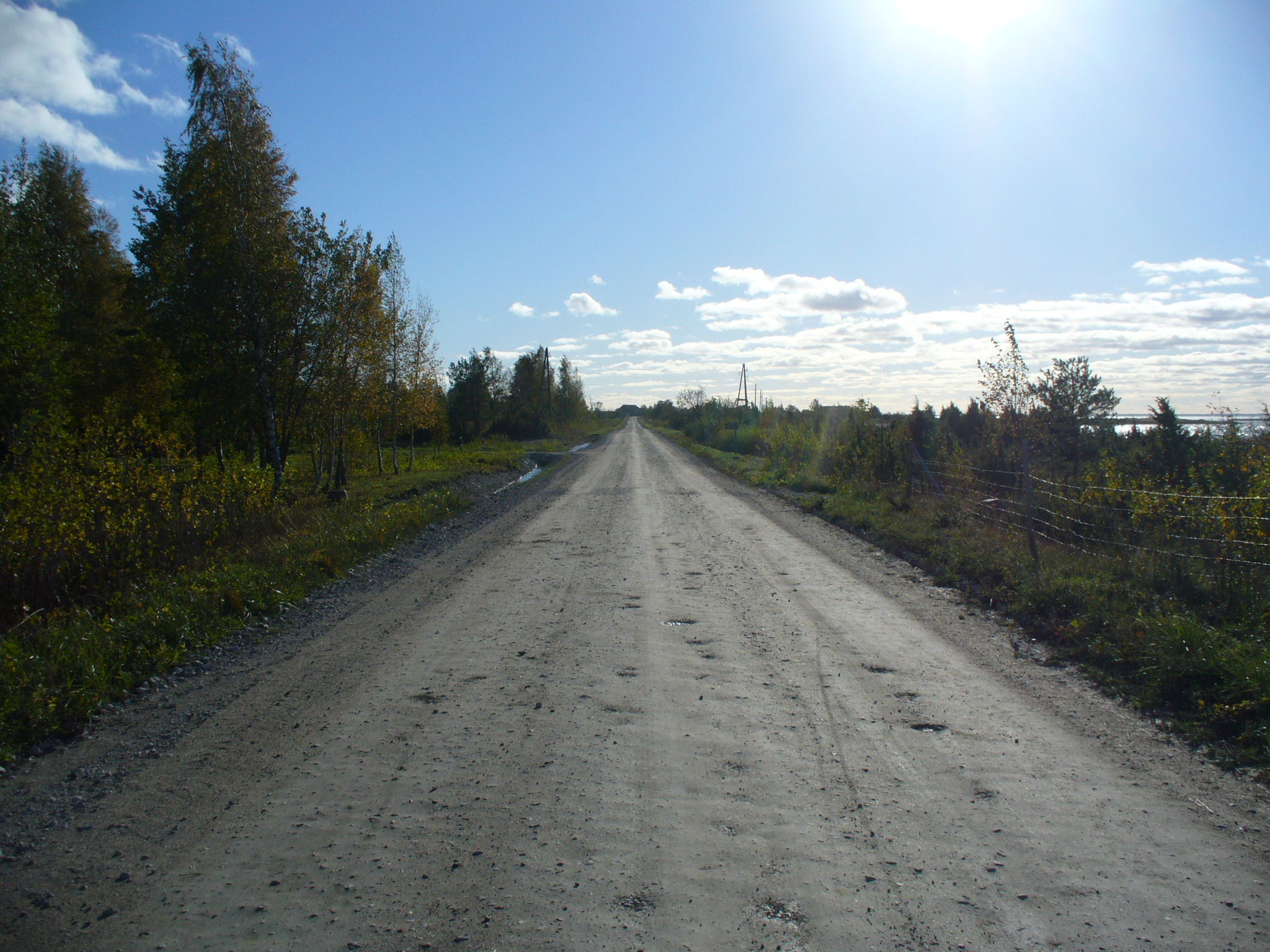

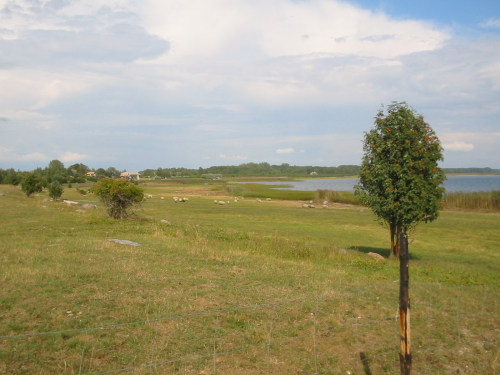

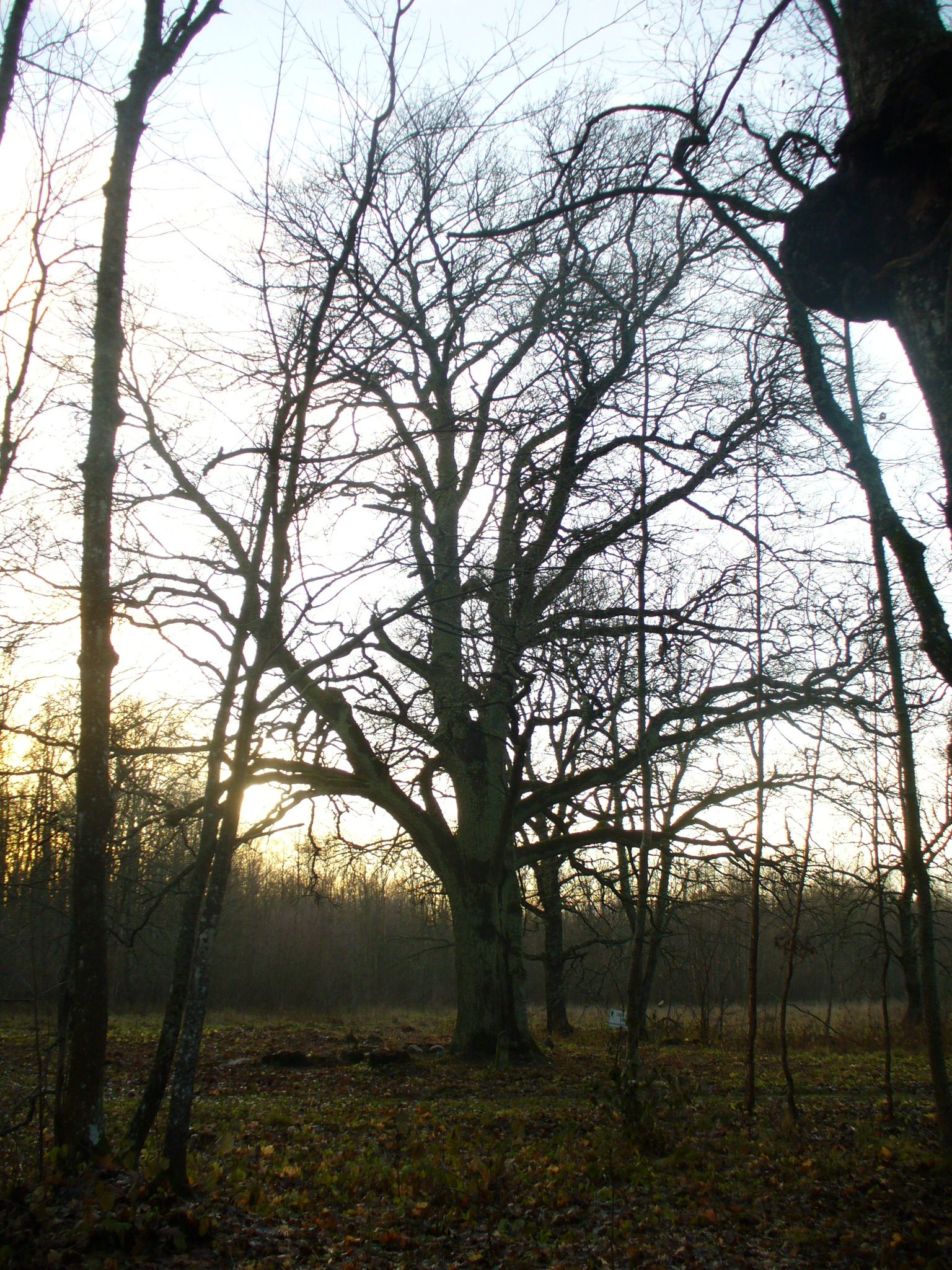
Lõpre oak

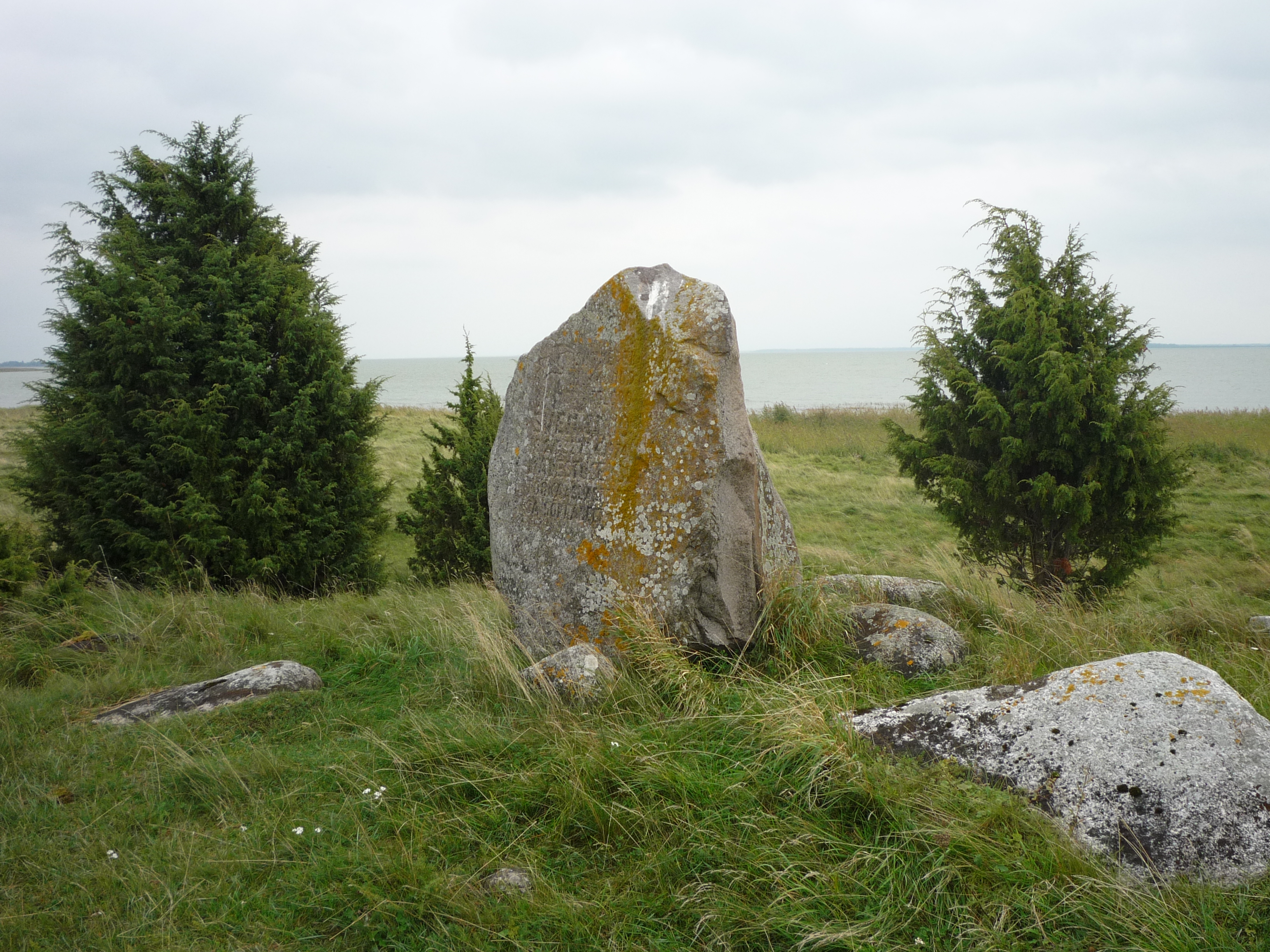
Monument stone for Sven Onno

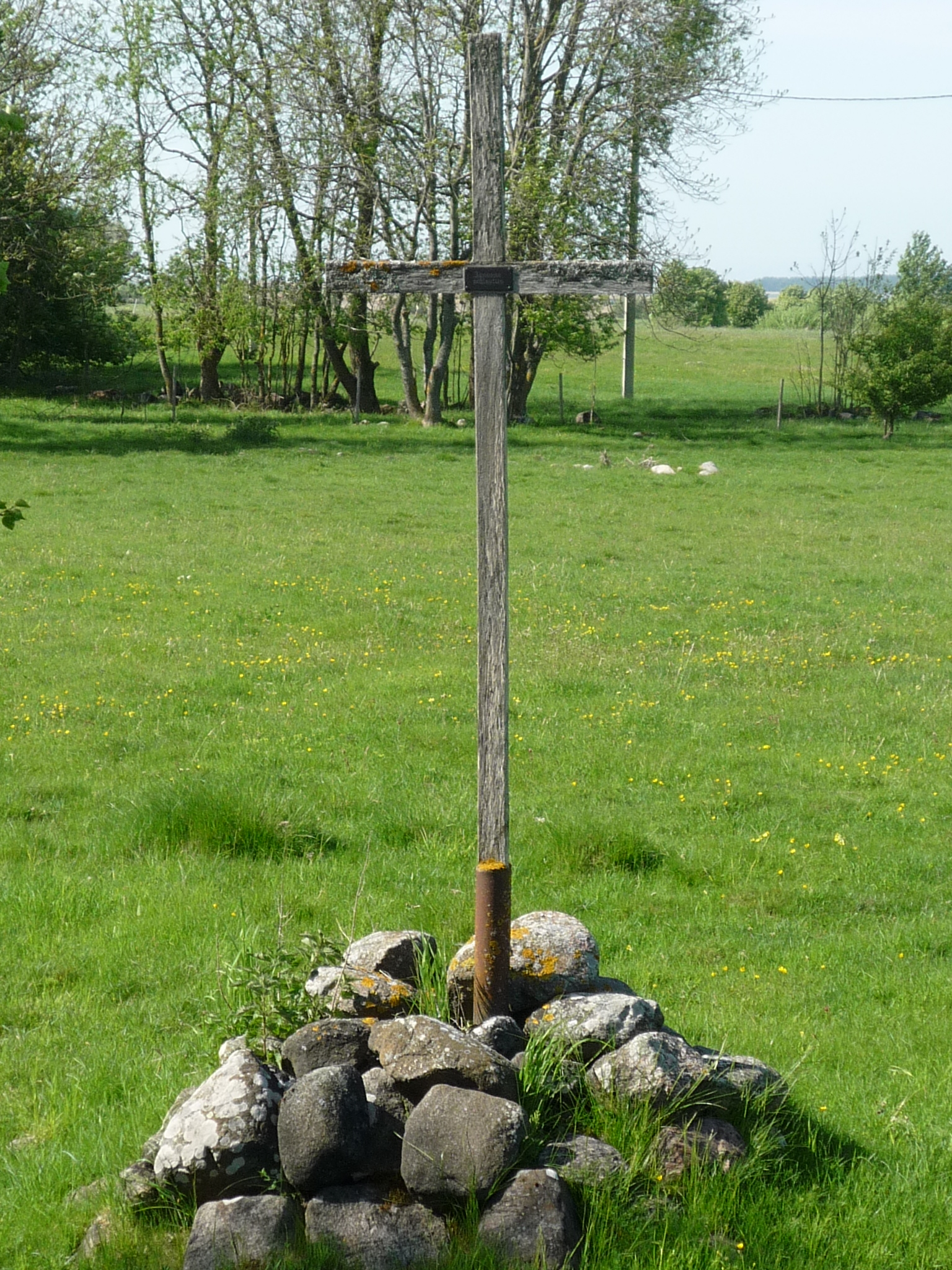

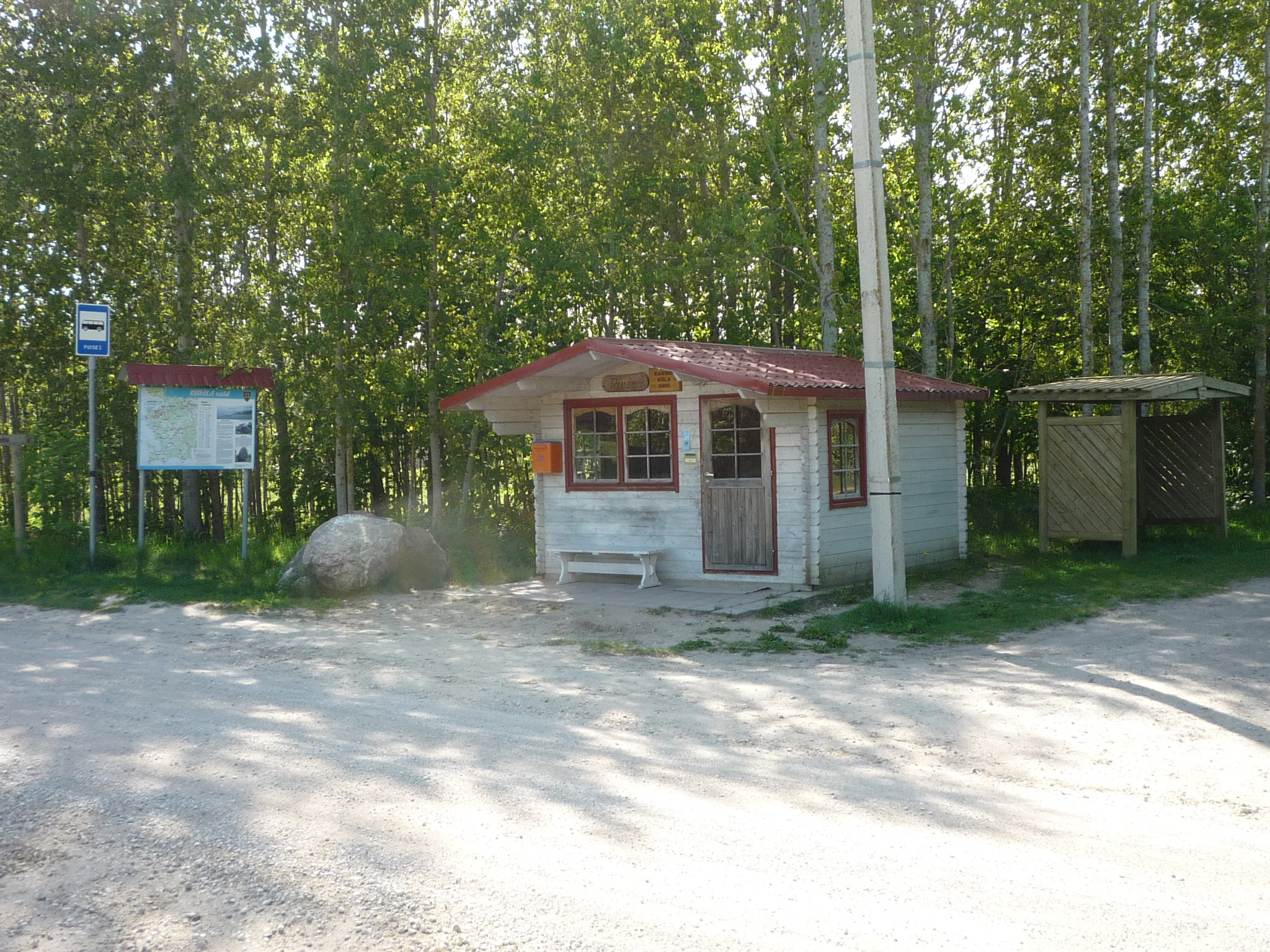
Bus station of Puise
