= Shackleton Ice Shelf =

Ice shelf of Antarctica

Location of Shackleton Ice Shelf in Antarctica

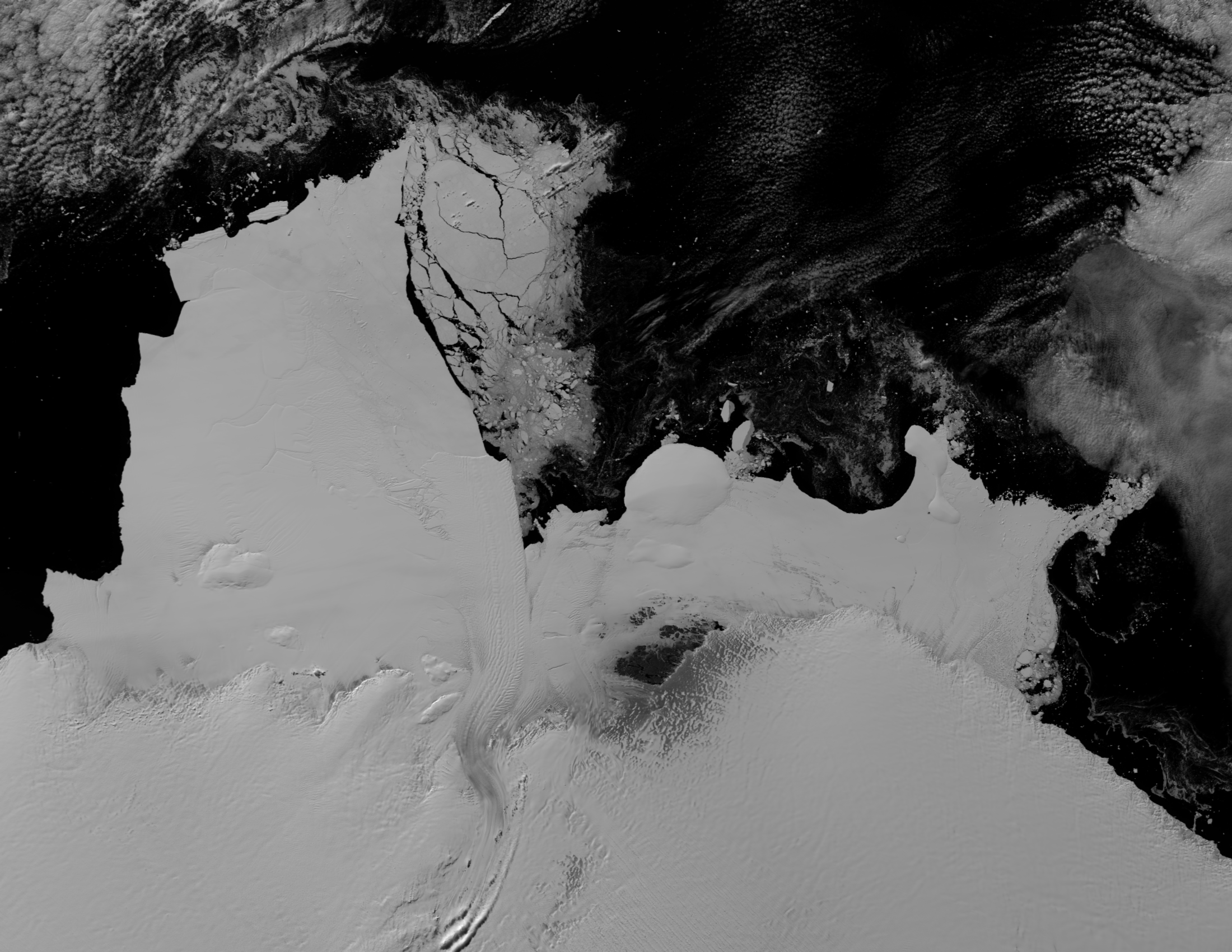
NASA MODIS view of the ice shelf, seen in May 2009

Shackleton Ice Shelf is an extensive ice shelf fronting the coast of East Antarctica from 95° E to 105° E. It extends for an along-shore distance of about 384 kilometres (239 mi), projecting seaward about 145 kilometres (90 mi) in the western portion and 64 kilometres (40 mi) in the east. It occupies an area of 33,820 square kilometres (13,058 sq mi). It is part of Mawson Sea and separates the Queen Mary Coast to the west from the Knox Coast of Wilkes Land to the east.

== Discovery and naming ==
The existence of this ice shelf was first made known by the USEE under Charles Wilkes who mapped a portion of it from the Vincennes in February 1840. It was explored by the Australian Antarctic Expedition under Douglas Mawson (1911–14) who named it for Sir Ernest Shackleton. The extent of the ice shelf was mapped in greater detail in 1955, using aerial photography obtained by US Navy Operation Highjump, 1946–47. Further mapping by the Soviet Expedition of 1956 showed the portion eastward of Scott Glacier to be a part of this ice shelf.

== Important Bird Area ==
A 500 ha site (64°59′19″S 96°09′21″E) on the ice shelf has been designated an Important Bird Area (IBA) by BirdLife International because it supports a breeding colony of some 6,500 emperor penguins, based on 2009 satellite imagery.

== See also ==
- List of glaciers
- List of Antarctic ice shelves
- Chugunov Island
