= Peeter All =

Estonian fisherman, farmer, ship captain, shipowner, and rescuer of mariners

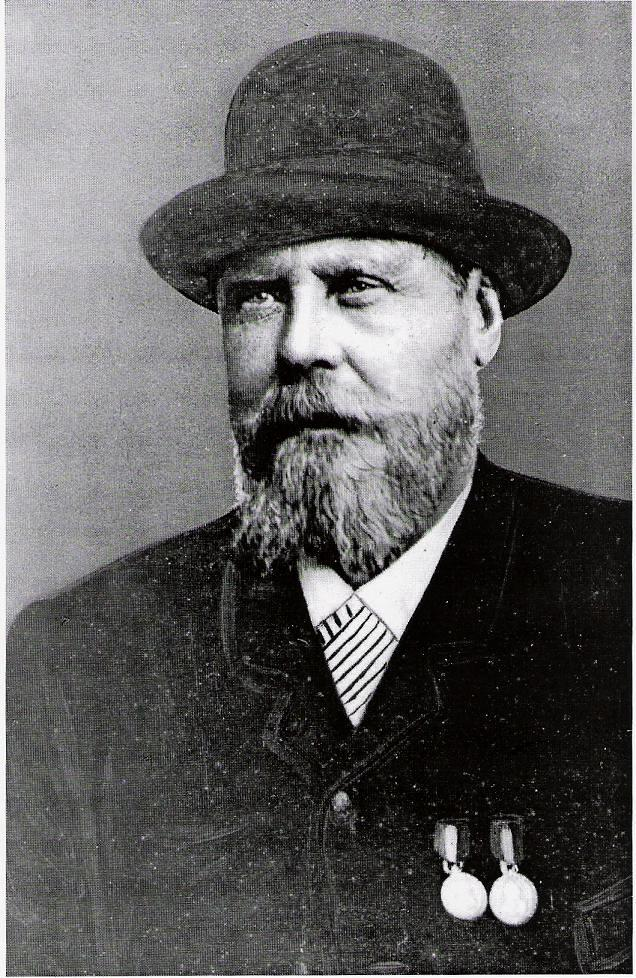
- Peeter All in 1880
- Born: c. 1829
- Died: 1898 (aged 68–69)
- Occupations: Estonian fisherman, farmer, ship captain, shipowner, and rescuer of mariners

Peeter All (c. 1829–1898) was an Estonian fisherman, farmer, ship captain, shipowner, rescuer of mariners in distress, and salvage diver. He is best known for his multifaceted maritime career and contributions to the Estonian maritime industry.

== Early years ==
Peeter All's parents, Ado and Marie, were of lower income and lived on Saaremaa's Loona Manor. Saaremaa (known as Oesel in German), is Estonia's largest island (2,673km^{2}) and has numerous small, rocky, low-lying islands off its western coast. The largest of these is Vilsandi. When Baron Hoyningen-Huene was of one year of age, he sent the family to live on Loonalaid, a small (1km^{2}.) uninhabited Baltic Sea island, so that his father could monitor hay grown there that provided feed for the manor's livestock. The family survived primarily from fishing and farming the local animals. Peeter grew to 6' 8" tall and left home by twenty years of age to become a seaman. During the Crimean War (1853–1856), Peeter started to run the Baltic Sea blockade with a cargo of salt from Sweden with no avail. Peeter was arrested by the British, his ship was burnt, and he was jailed for three years.

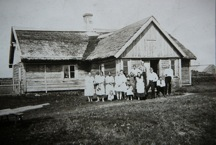
Photo of the All family's farmhouse on Loonalaid. 1920-1930

== Farming ==
After being released from jail, All returned to Loonalaid and planted potatoes in the Kelp soil. He found that these potatoes ripened much faster than conventionally planted potatoes because the sun's rays heated the shallow waters. Demand for these early season potatoes was strong, and these potatoes commanded a premium price at market in Riga, Latvia.

Peeter eventually bought Loonalaid from the Baron, and employed ~6 farmhands who, when not working in the fields or with the livestock, assisted in Peeter's salvaging operations.

== Salvaging shipwrecks ==
With profits from selling potatoes, All bought a diving helmet from Germany and began to salvage the numerous ships lying on the ocean floor that had been wrecked on the nearby shoals. It was a rarity for ships in the Baltic to carry precious cargo and All primarily salvaged coal, metals and antique porcelain, the sale of which helped him to move inside wealthy social groups which he would not have been able to join otherwise. All found that upper classes in St. Petersburg, Russia were prepared to pay large amounts for porcelain that was over one hundred years old. All sold many items, becoming one of the wealthiest Estonians of the time period. In 1880 All was the first Estonian to have his photograph taken, a colored ferrotype that is on display at the Estonian Maritime Museum in Tallinn.

== Shipbuilding ==
In 1859, in partnership with the Baron, All built the first ship launched on Saaremaa, a single masted, 32 Ton, 15.7m long sloop named “Adler” (Kotkas). By 1867 this vessel was registered only in All's name. In 1869 All built another vessel coined “Richard”. In 1875, All constructed the two-masted schooner “Schnelle Rosalie (Fast Rosalie), the largest ship (78 tonnes) then built on Saaremaa. In 1890, he purchased the “Zintenhof”, a 20-meter-long steel-hulled steamship that All used for salvage and maritime rescue operations in Estonia, Sweden and Finland. All received some medals for his rescues of both seaman and ships. In 1861, at the christening of his first child, British captain Robert Davies, officer Greit Batschets and seaman William Poole were in attendance. All had rescued them earlier that day from a British barque, name unrecorded, that had been wrecked nearby.

== Family ==
In 1860, All married Elise Tihik and they had five children, three girls and two boys, most of whom grew up, married and continued their maritime life either on Loonalaid or the much larger nearby island of Vilsandi. Two of All's grandsons, from his two eldest daughters, were Peter Mender and Johann Kalmar and both became Master Mariners and moved to the Far East to find work. Mender worked for Standard Oil captaining tankers on China's Yangtze River and Kalmar worked for Möller & Co. captaining cargo ships out of Shanghai. Both siblings returned to Estonia in the 1930s and were co-founders of the Estonian shipping company Merilaid & Co.
