= Agemian =

Agemian (Armenian: Աճեմյան) is an Armenian surname. Notable people with the surname include:

- Ariel Agemian (1904–1963), Armenian artist
- Charles A. Agemian (1909–1996), Armenian-American banker

== See also ==
- Ajemian
