= Artur Toom =

Estonian ornithologist

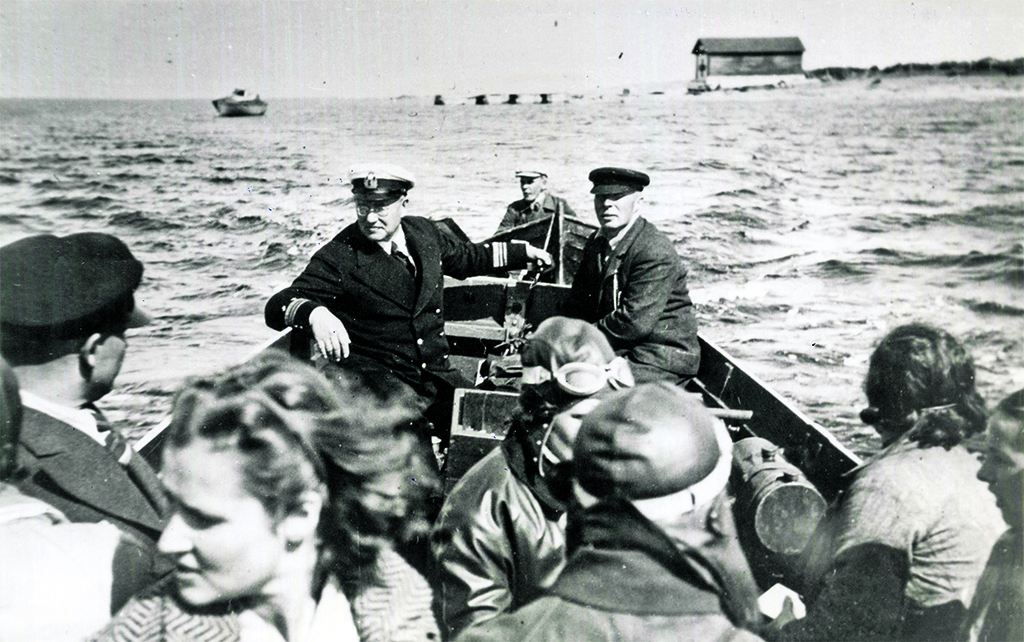
Toom (spectacled and in uniform) with visitors to Vilsandi in 1939.

Artur Toom (born Artur Eduard Johannes Thom; 5 January 1884 – 29 March 1942) was an Estonian ornithologist and conservationist who worked on the island of Vilsandi which later became Vilsandi National Park. He was arrested following the Soviet occupation of Estonia and died in Usollag Gulag labor camp.

Toom was born in the village of Sagariste in Pihtla municipality, Saare County, and became a lighthouse keeper on Vilsandi in 1906 where he started active bird conservation. He leased out the Vaika islands and encouraged bird nesting. In 1917, the Germans occupied Saaremaa and many nests were destroyed and the birds and eggs eaten. Following the Estonian War of Independence, in 1921 he studied fisheries, meteorology, ornithology and taxidermy at the University of Tartu. He established a research station at Kuusnõmme in 1922 and a museum in 1926. In 1930 he established a conservation society to protect the island of Saaremaa. Only 6 pairs of common eider nested on the Vaika islands in 1906, and after protection, it went up to hundreds in 1938, and now in thousands. He published a book on the birds of Vilsandi in 1932, assisted by his wife Alma Rosalie Toom (née Õispuu). Following Soviet invasion, he was arrested by the NKVD on 11 June 1941 in Kuressaare, and sent to Usollag camp in Solikamsky District, Russian Soviet Federative Socialist Republic. He was sentenced to death for espionage and anti-Soviet activity on 16 May 1942 but following an appeal, he was not executed but died in captivity on 29 March, aged 58. His wife Alma was also sentenced to exile and died in Nagorsk in 1945.
