= Vaika islands =

Island in Estonia

Coordinates: 58°22′N 21°49′E

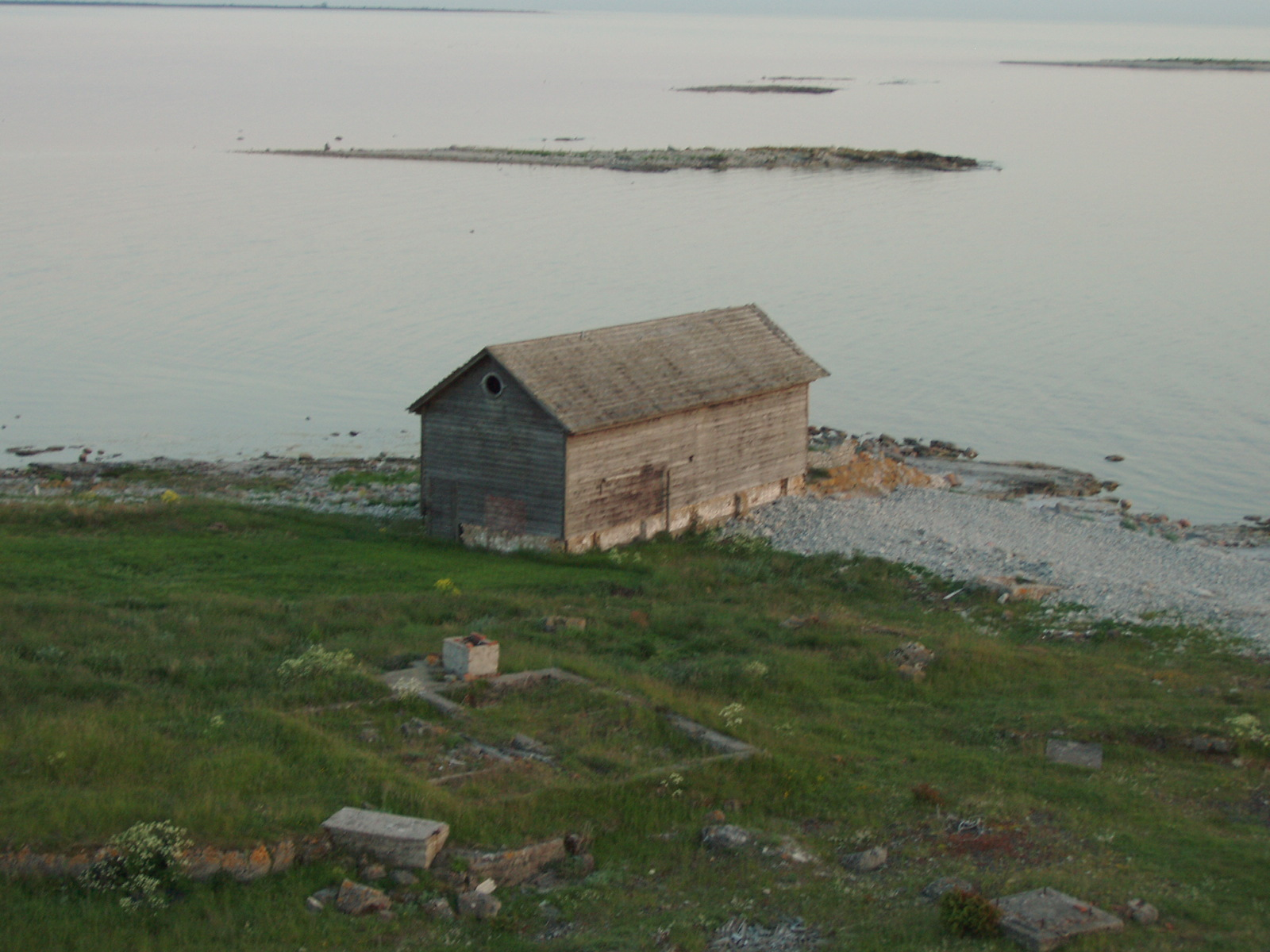
Vaika islands in the sea seen from nearby Vilsandi lighthouse

Vaika Islands is a group of islands belonging to the country of Estonia. They lie next to Vilsandi. The Vaika islands are referenced in a book titled Islands of Estonia.

Vaika islands are Alumine Vaika, Karirahu, Keskmine Vaika, Kullipank, Mustpank and Ülemine Vaika.

Wildlife:

Eurasian Oystercatcher

Common Tern

== See also ==
- List of islands of Estonia
