= Erik Schmidt (painter) =

Estonian painter and writer

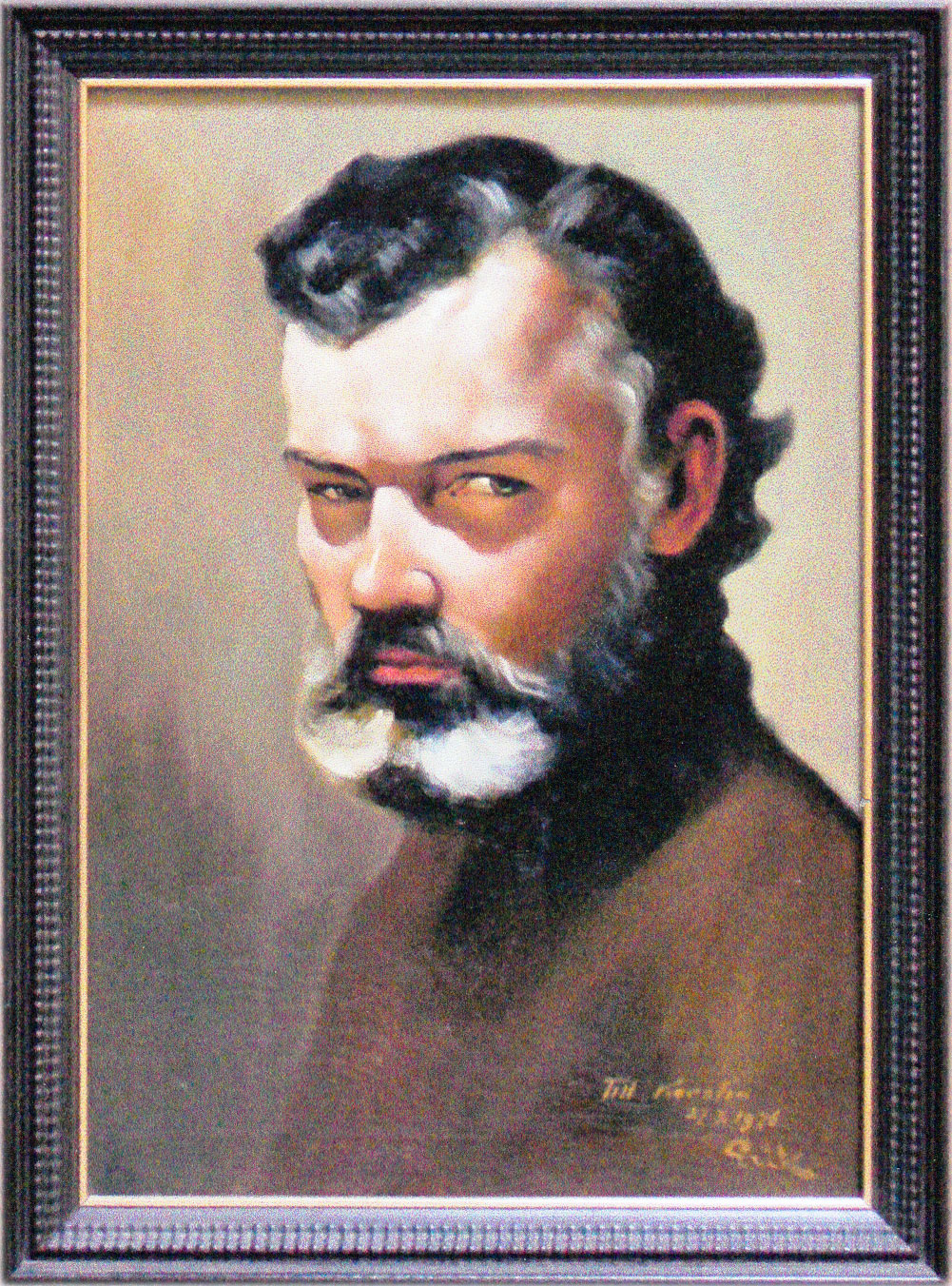
Erik Schmidt's self-portrait in 1976 when he was in his early 50s

Erik Schmidt (15 August 1925 on the island of Naissaar, Estonia – 18 April 2014) was a painter and writer.

Schmidt's father, August Schmidt, a master mariner, was captain of SS Merisaar, a merchant ship owned by Merilaid & Co. Erik also hoped to become a sea captain but he was also a talented amateur painter. Schmidt's uncle was a famous optician Bernhard Schmidt mostly known for inventing the Schmidt camera. Schmidt went to school in the next-door Swedish school, and after four years continued his studies at the Swedish College at Haapsalu. His early paintings were noticed by Ants Laikmaa. At the age of 17 he became a teacher of the primary school where he himself had been a pupil. This freed him from the danger of having to "volunteer" for service in either the Estonian Legion or the German Arbeitsdienst. At the end of October 1943 the danger from a new Soviet occupation became possible and Erik Schmidt and his parents decided to leave everything and flee to Sweden where they got a warm welcome from the ship-owning Brodin family. After World War II Schmidt signed on as an apprentice on the maiden voyage on a Brodin Line cargo- and passenger-liner, said to be the fastest in the world. After a year he had to leave the ship in the next Swedish port in order to fulfil his military service.

During one of these visits to New York City he met the Armenian painter Ariel Agemian, who had ended his studies at the Accademia di Belle Arti of Venice with a gold medal, and been dubbed Knight of the Order of St. Gregory by Pope Pius XII. Agemian was a very gifted and capable teacher, who brought a complete change into Erik's seafaring life. During his voyages to South American ports, Schmidt tried his hand at drawing and painting, showed the results to Ariel, and was guided and encouraged by him, until he finally decided to give up seafaring and become a painter. After a short stay in Sweden in December 1949 he studied at the École nationale supérieure des Beaux-Arts from 1950 to 1953. After a stay in Johannesburg, South Africa in 1957, he established himself in Palma de Mallorca, where he lived and worked for the rest of his life.

Erik Schmidt described his philosophy of seeing and painting:

You must keep in mind, that there is beauty all around us, and that it is the painter who has to discover it and be able to reproduce what he sees, in order to bring enjoyment to everybody else.

== Awards ==
- Society of Culture of Estonian Swedes (Samfundet för Estlandssvensk Kultur) twice

== Individual expositions ==
- Salon de Printemps, Paris 1951.
- Stuttaford Galleries, Johannesburg 1954.
- Ekströms Konstgalleri, Stockholm 1955.
- Ateneo de Santander, Santander 1956.
- Eesti Majandusühisus Produkt, Stockholm 1957.
- Galeria Rembrandt, Palma de Mallorca 1980.
- Eesti Maja, Stockholm 1988.
- Eesti Maja, Stockholm 1989.
- Claustre de Sant Antoniet, Palma de Mallorca 2009.

== Works ==
Erik Schmidt has published many articles. Most are in Swedish but he has also written books in Estonian, English and Spanish.

- Tormised teekonnad. Perona, Pärnu 1993.
- Optical Illusions: The Life Story of Bernhard Schmidt, the Great Stellar Optician of the Twentieth Century. Teaduste Akadeemia Kirjastus, 1995, ISBN 9985-50-102-0.
- Naissaare põlised perekonnad (Hrsg.). Teaduste Akadeemia Kirjastus, 1995, ISBN 9985-50-104-7.
- Pagana eestlane. Eesti Raamat, 1996, ISBN 9985-65-060-3.
- Tuultest tõugatud. Eesti Raamat, 1999, ISBN 9985-65-221-5.
- Rännakud enne koitu. Virgela, 2001, ISBN 9985-9300-1-0.
- Minu onu Bernhard Schmidt. Ilmamaa, 2002, ISBN 9985-77-061-7.
- Jumalaga, Naissaar!. Olion, Tallinn 2004, ISBN 9985-66-366-7.
- Päevapilte Hispaaniast. Eesti Raamat, 2004, ISBN 9985-65-455-2.
- Bernhard Schmidt 1879–1935. 2004.
