= Vilsandi =

Island in Estonia

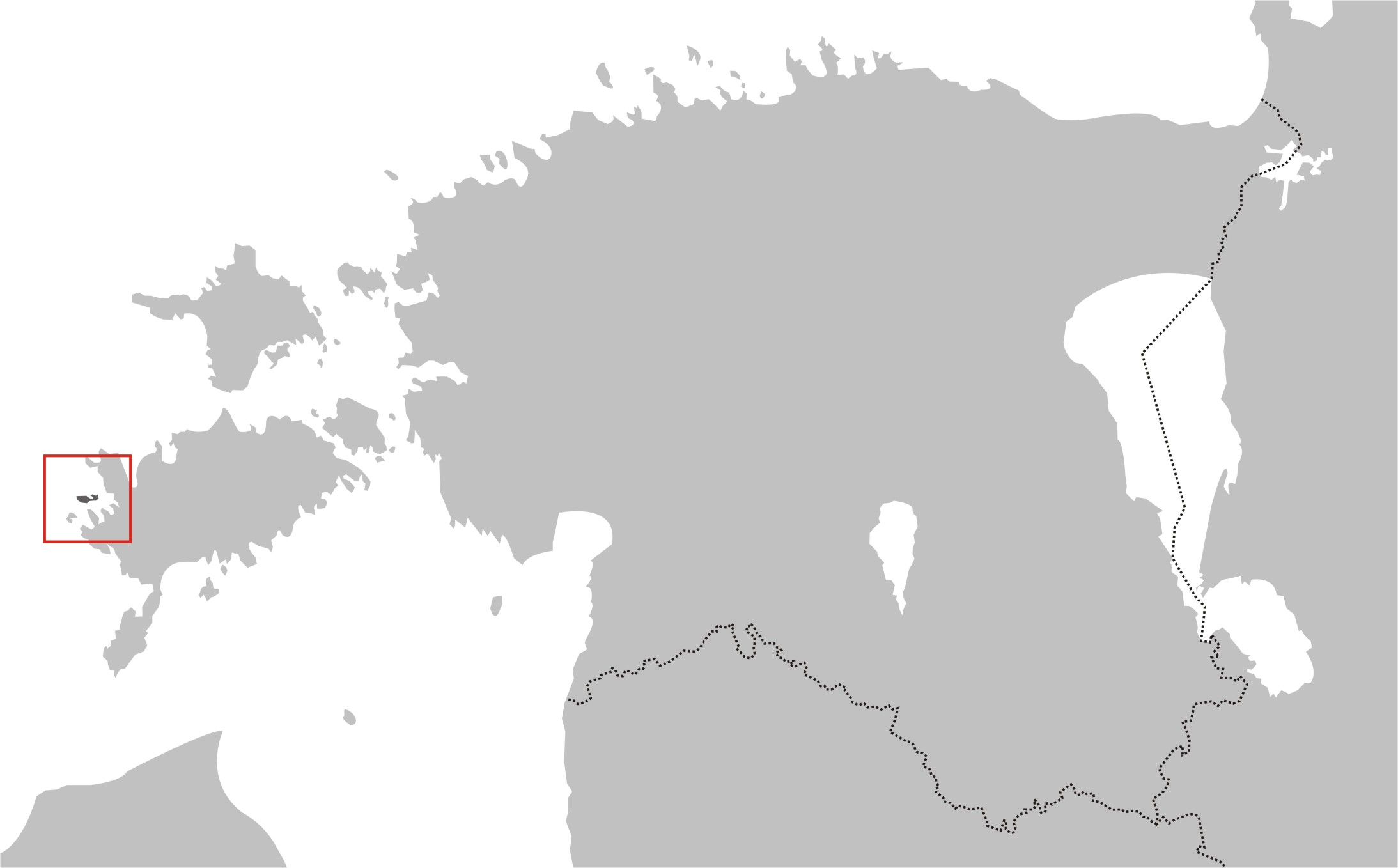
- Location of Vilsandi in Estonia.

Geography
- Location: Baltic Sea (Atlantic Ocean)
- Coordinates: 58°23′N 2°51′E
- Archipelago: West Estonian archipelago
- Area: 9.4 km^{2} (3.6 sq mi)
- Highest elevation: 4.5 m (14.8 ft)

Administration
- Estonia

Demographics
- Population: 22 (2017)

The island of Vilsandi of Kihelkonna district of Saaremaa Parish of Estonia's Saare County is located in the Baltic Sea. It covers an area of some 9 square km and is the westernmost populated island in Estonia. The surrounding waters are shallow and rocky and many ships travelling the Baltic have perished nearby. The island of Vilsandi can be reached by boat, by truck having suitable clearance or on foot by wading from Saaremaa island. Much of the island is now part of Vilsandi National Park, which grew from a bird reserve founded in 1910. It is a highly sensitive ecosystem due to the use of the area by many migratory birds as a breeding and nesting ground. Hunting is absolutely prohibited. This park is a popular tourist destination not only for local Estonians, but also people of Finland who are visiting Estonia in greater and greater numbers.

== History ==
In 1703, a ship owned by Dutchman Johann Doll ran aground and sank in the Baltic Sea. Doll managed to get ashore to a nearby island and named the island “Felsland” meaning rocky island. He stayed to live there and, over time, Doll's farm became known in Estonian as Tolli talu (farm) and Felsland became known as Vilsandi.

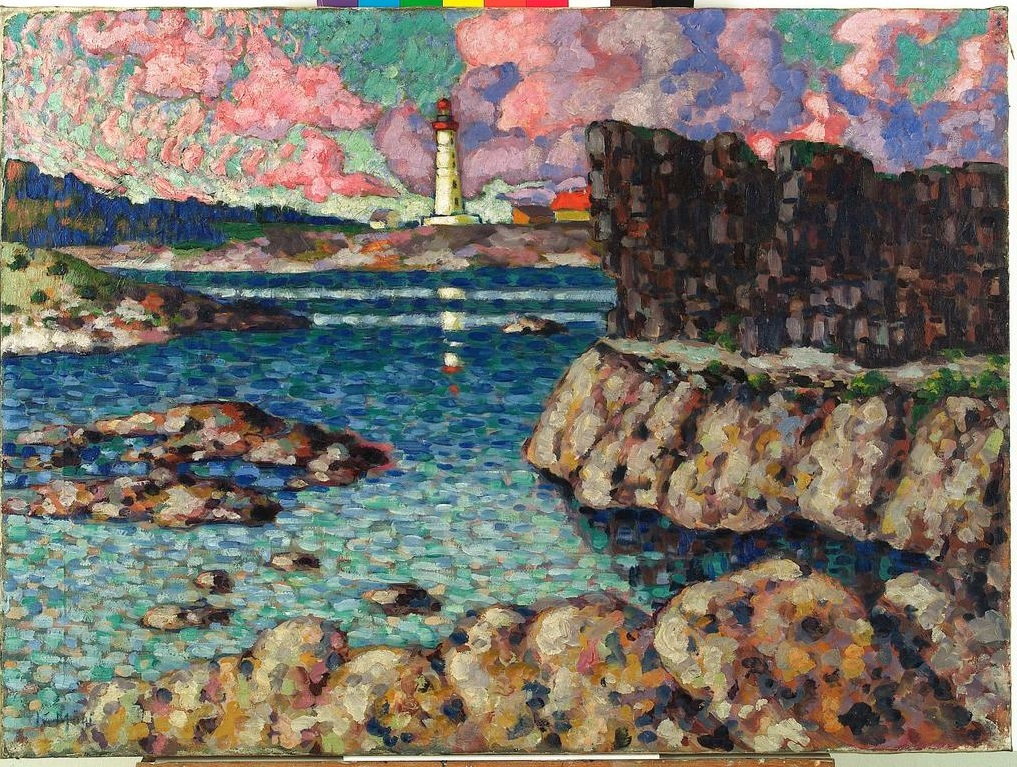
"Landscape of Vilsandi", by Estonian artist Konrad Mägi (1913–1914).

Due to its location alongside a maritime trade route, it was important to seafaring nations that Vilsandi have some shelter for shipwreck survivors. This was especially important to the Russian Tsar and the first shelter on the island was built in 1806. This was followed by the construction of a 37-meter high lighthouse in 1809. A lifesaving station was built beside the lighthouse in 1859, and a telegraph line was installed in 1883, primarily to communicate news about ships running aground.

The earliest known family settled on Vilsandi in 1826 and in 1896 this family took the surname of Mänder. Over time, as the letter “ä” was not familiar to the various non-Estonian seamen in the area, some family members changed Mänder to Mender because it was easier to spell. By 1860, 18 families lived on the island. In 1934 a census recorded that 32 families and 169 people lived on Vilsandi, sustained mainly by fishing (flounder, cod, salmon) and seafaring. The surrounding ocean is shallow with some depths to 22 metres (72 feet). In 1931 a seabird museum was built on Vilsandi and before World War II (1939–1945) there were about 200 permanent residents on the island and about 3,000 – 5,000 tourists that would visit during the summer months.

In 1870, the British ship Admiral ran aground near Vilsandi and many barrels of a new product, petroleum – the oil economy did not exist yet – washed ashore and were used for fuel at Vilsandi's lighthouse and island homes, replacing firewood and flax oil.

Artur Toom (1884–1942) was appointed to manage Vilsandi's lighthouse in 1906, and he was instrumental in having the small Vaika islands, just northwest of Vilsandi, designated as a maritime bird reserve in 1910. The islands comprise a sensitive marine ecosystem used by a multitude of migratory birds as breeding and nesting grounds.

=== World War I ===
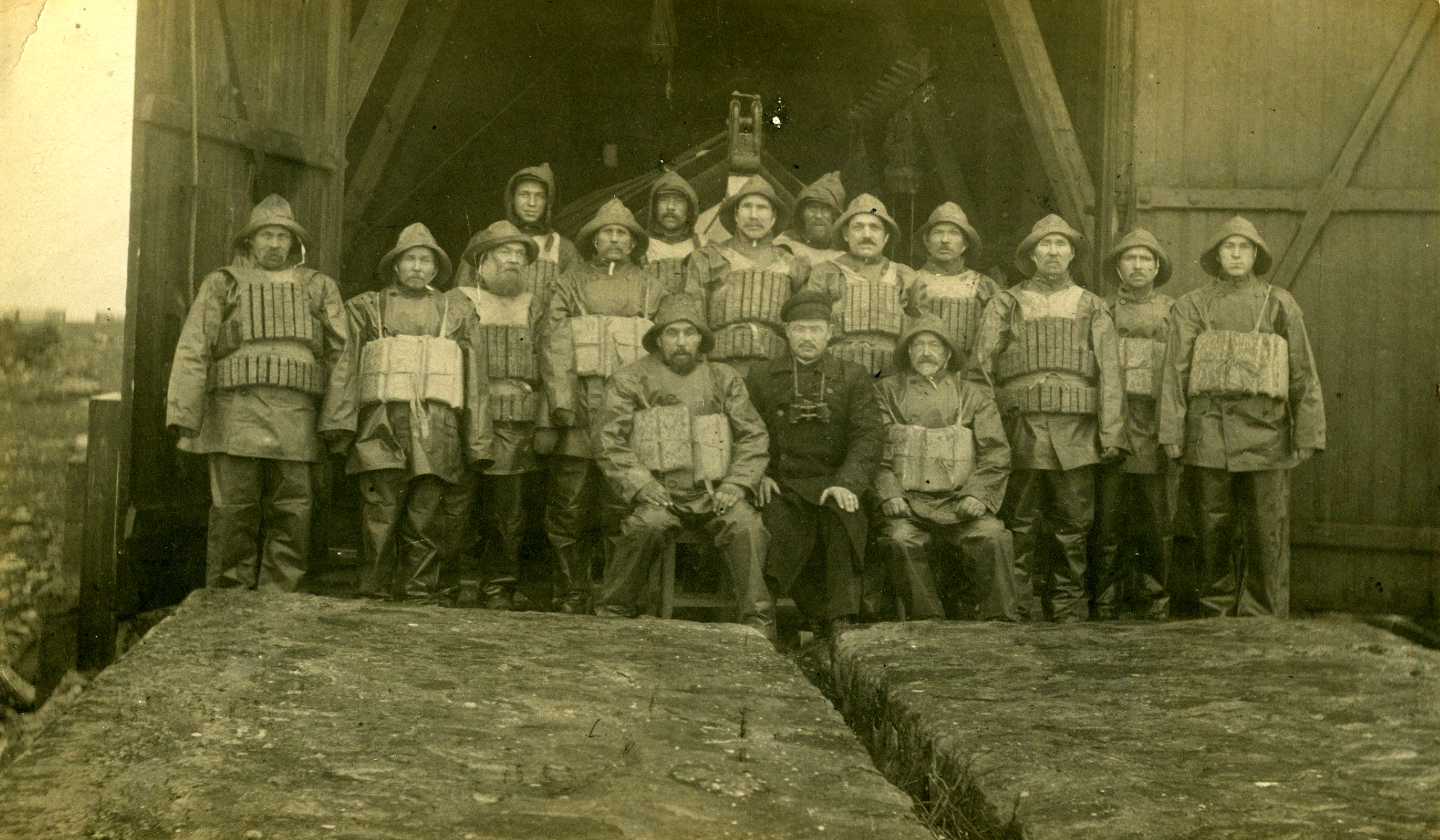
Vilsandi sea rescue team circa 1922

During World War I, in October 1917, Germany launched Operation Albion, a massive fleet of over 300 ships and 25,000 soldiers, to occupy Saaremaa and other Baltic islands to try to force Russia, who governed Estonia at the time, to surrender. The invasion began at Vilsandi and was first noticed by Artur Toom, Vilsandi's lighthouse keeper. In 1941, Toom was arrested by the Russians, accused of undertaking counterrevolutionary activities and spying for capitalist countries, and was sent to a Stalinist work camp where he perished in 1942.

One of Vilsandi's residents was Jaen Tear, a well-known seaman and shipbuilder, and the largest ship-owner on the island. He also managed the lifesaving station until his death in 1925. Jaen Tear's grandson, Jaan Elmar Teär, was born in Kuressaare on 24 December 1930. In 1941, Jaan Teär's father and uncle, who were being held by the Russians at the Bishop's Castle in Kuressaare, the capital of Saaremaa, were executed.

Vilsandi has produced 16 ship captains or Master Mariners, some of whom were related to Peeter All (1829–1898), a noted resident of the nearby island of Loonalaid. Such captains include Peter Mender, Johann Kalmar, Siim Roos and Johannes Mänder. Kalmar, Mender and Roos worked in the Russian Far East and China prior to World War II and in 1930 co-founded the Estonian shipping firm Merilaid & Co.

=== World War II ===
On 19 September 1944 about 40 of Vilsandi's 155 inhabitants escaped by boat to Sweden, evading a blockade by the Kriegsmarine. Records show that 96 people escaped from Vilsandi in 1944, during the war, followed by one who escaped in 1956 and another in 1959, by which time only 46 inhabitants remained. Of the people who were able to flee the Russians, the majority settled in Sweden and others headed to Canada and the United States.

In 1945, after World War II had ended, the Soviet Union designated all of the islands around Vilsandi a restricted area closed to the public for national security reasons.

== Today ==
Vilsandi became part of an Estonian national park in the early 1990s and today only a few people live there year-round. Many tourists visit in the summer months, some of which explore, by kayak, the approximately 100 small islands comprising the park. Tens of thousands of waterfowl migrate through or nest in the national park as do most of the Baltic grey seals.

== Climate ==
Vilsandi has one of the most maritime climates (Cfb) in Estonia and thus it experiences generally cooler summers and milder winters than other parts of Estonia with smaller annual temperature range. Vilsandi is as well is usually the part of Estonia which receives the most hours of sunlight during a year with its weather station statistically the location with the most sunshine in Estonia.

Climate data for Vilsandi (normals 1991–2020, extremes 1865–present)
Month	Jan	Feb	Mar	Apr	May	Jun	Jul	Aug	Sep	Oct	Nov	Dec	Year
Record high °C (°F)	8.1 (46.6)	8.0 (46.4)	15.9 (60.6)	23.5 (74.3)	28.7 (83.7)	31.6 (88.9)	32.1 (89.8)	32.4 (90.3)	27.9 (82.2)	19.7 (67.5)	13.1 (55.6)	10.2 (50.4)	32.4 (90.3)
Mean daily maximum °C (°F)	1.3 (34.3)	0.4 (32.7)	2.6 (36.7)	7.6 (45.7)	12.9 (55.2)	17.1 (62.8)	20.8 (69.4)	20.6 (69.1)	16.1 (61.0)	10.5 (50.9)	6.0 (42.8)	3.3 (37.9)	9.9 (49.8)
Daily mean °C (°F)	−0.3 (31.5)	−1.4 (29.5)	0.6 (33.1)	4.7 (40.5)	9.7 (49.5)	14.2 (57.6)	17.8 (64.0)	17.8 (64.0)	13.9 (57.0)	8.7 (47.7)	4.5 (40.1)	1.9 (35.4)	7.7 (45.9)
Mean daily minimum °C (°F)	−2.2 (28.0)	−3.3 (26.1)	−1.4 (29.5)	2.4 (36.3)	7.0 (44.6)	11.7 (53.1)	15.4 (59.7)	15.3 (59.5)	11.7 (53.1)	6.7 (44.1)	2.8 (37.0)	0.1 (32.2)	5.5 (41.9)
Record low °C (°F)	−31.8 (−25.2)	−28.1 (−18.6)	−26.2 (−15.2)	−13.6 (7.5)	−3.1 (26.4)	3.2 (37.8)	7.1 (44.8)	7.3 (45.1)	0.4 (32.7)	−6.4 (20.5)	−10.8 (12.6)	−28.6 (−19.5)	−31.8 (−25.2)
Average precipitation mm (inches)	44 (1.7)	33 (1.3)	33 (1.3)	28 (1.1)	31 (1.2)	47 (1.9)	49 (1.9)	73 (2.9)	59 (2.3)	67 (2.6)	63 (2.5)	52 (2.0)	577 (22.7)
Average precipitation days (≥ 1.0 mm)	13.3	10.4	9.2	8.1	8.2	10.6	10.0	11.4	10.2	12.6	11.9	13.8	129.7
Average relative humidity (%)	86	86	83	81	80	82	81	80	81	82	86	86	83
Mean monthly sunshine hours	37.3	69.0	150.4	226.1	316.1	313.5	330.1	270.5	175.7	100.3	38.3	24.0	2,065.8
Source: Estonian Weather Service

== Notable residents ==
- Jaan Teär (1854-1925), ship owner and captain
- Artur Toom (1884-1942), Estonian ornithologist
- Jaan Tätte (born 1964), Estonian poet, actor, and singer
- Heino Väli (1928–1990), Estonian writer

== Gallery ==
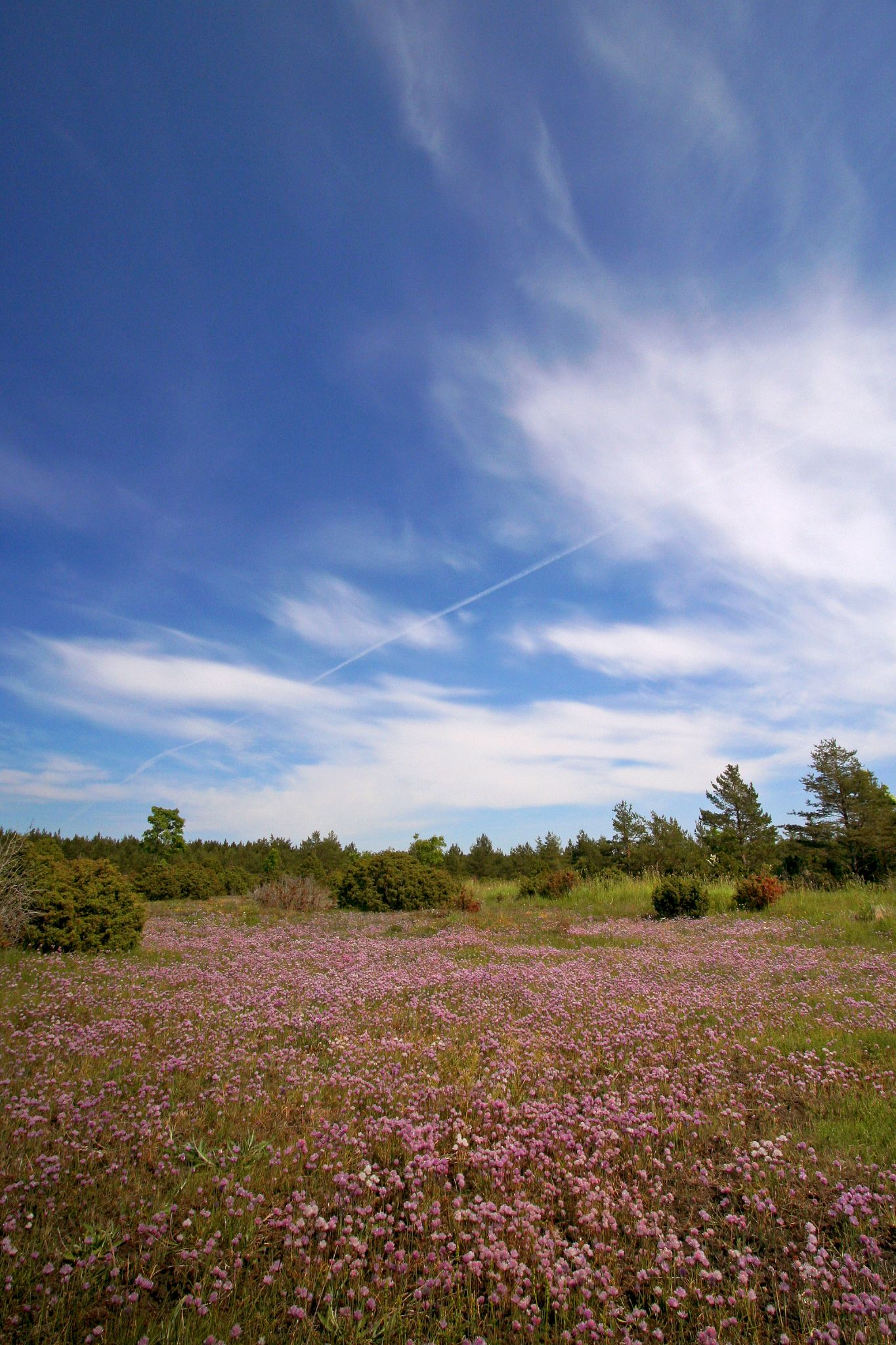
A meadow on Vilsandi in summer

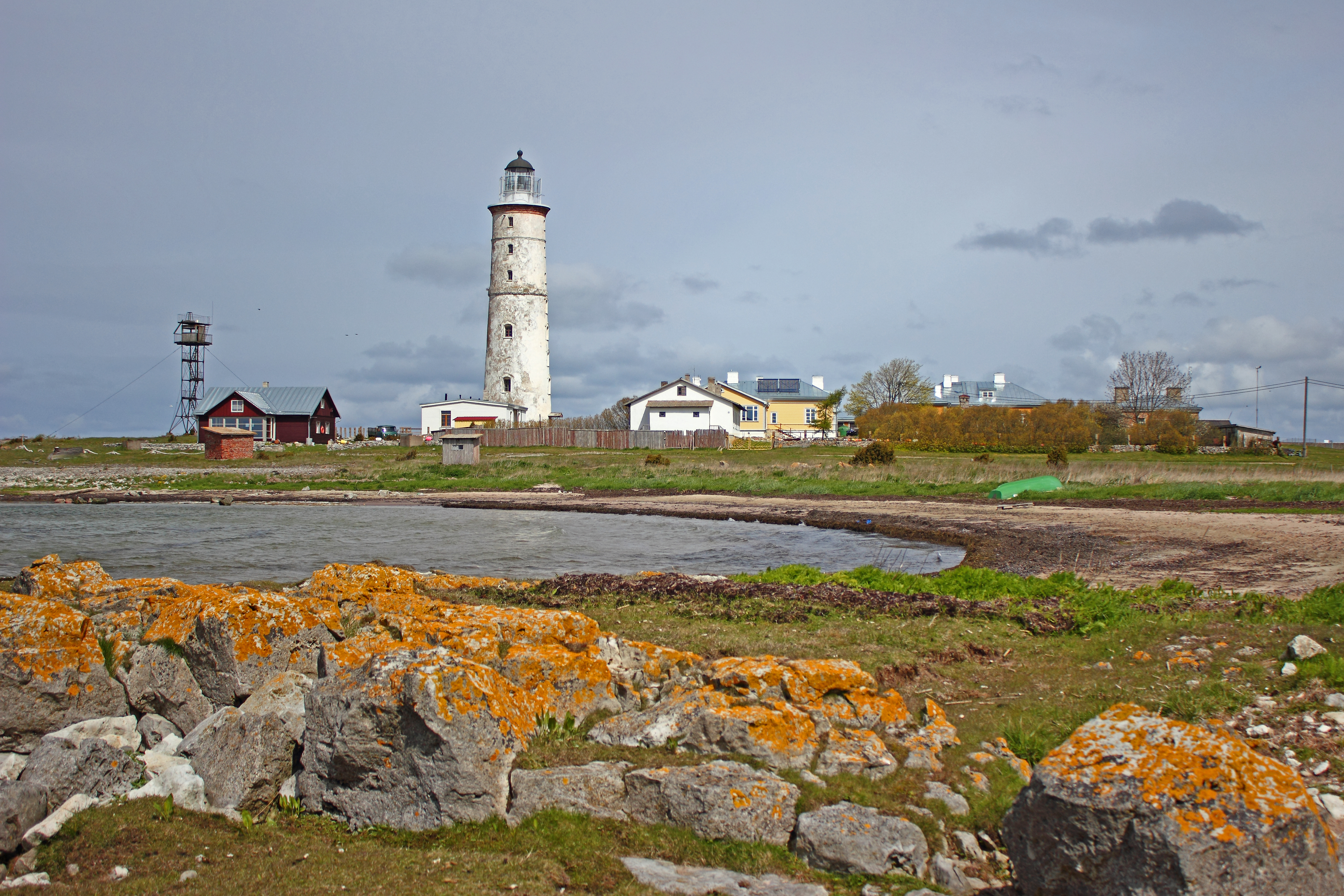
Vilsandi lighthouse

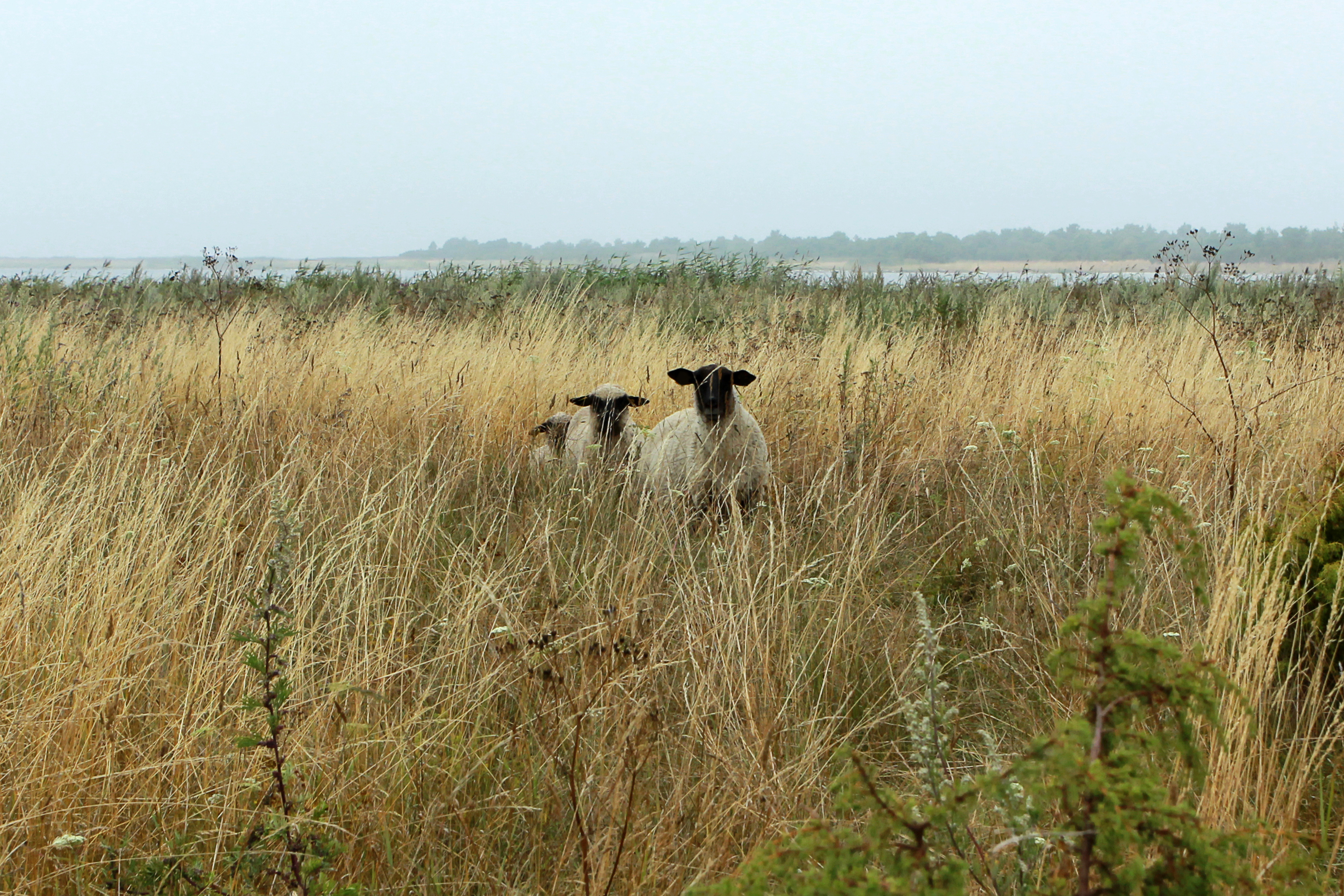
Sheep in Vilsandi

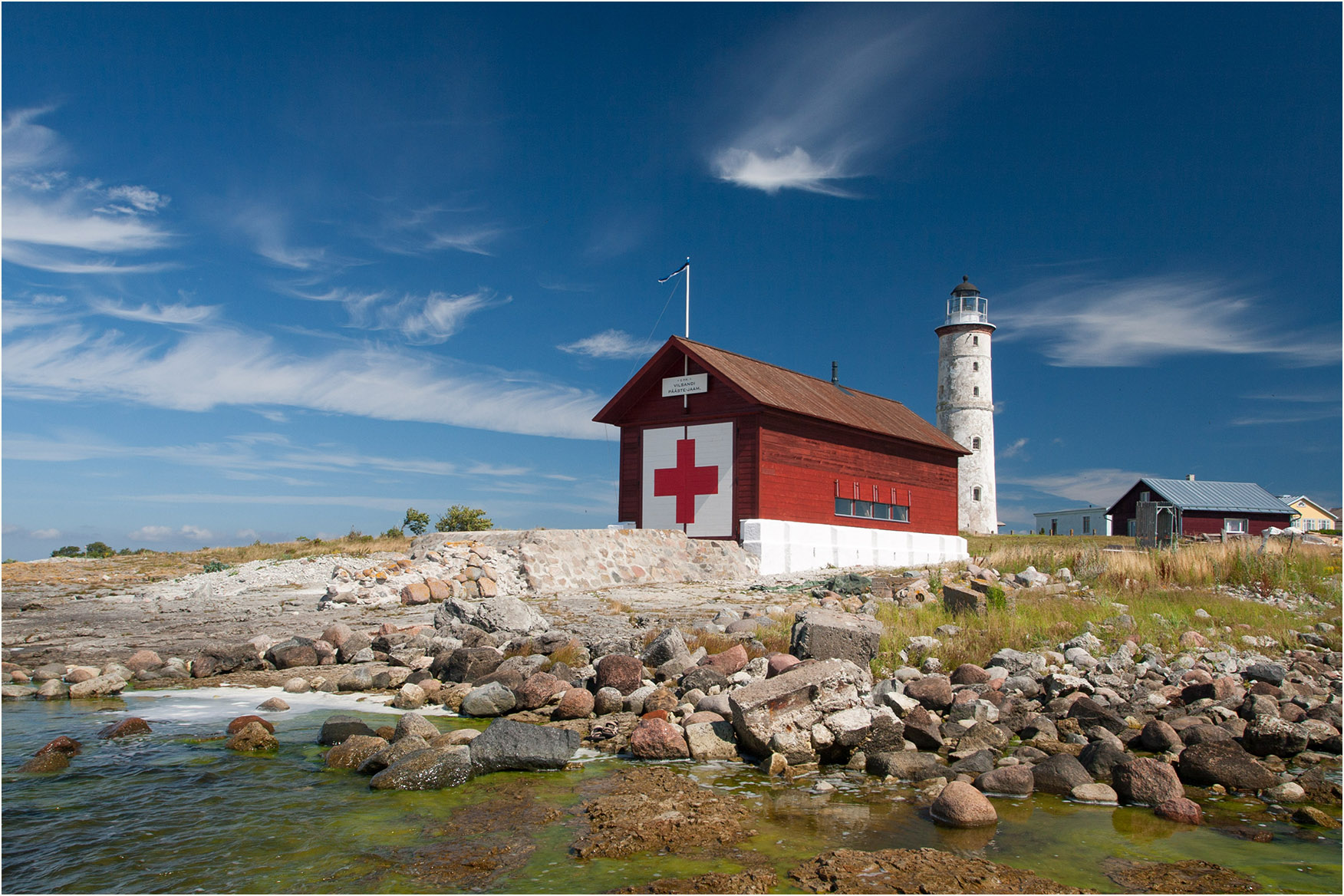
Vilsandi sea rescue station, wooden boathouse

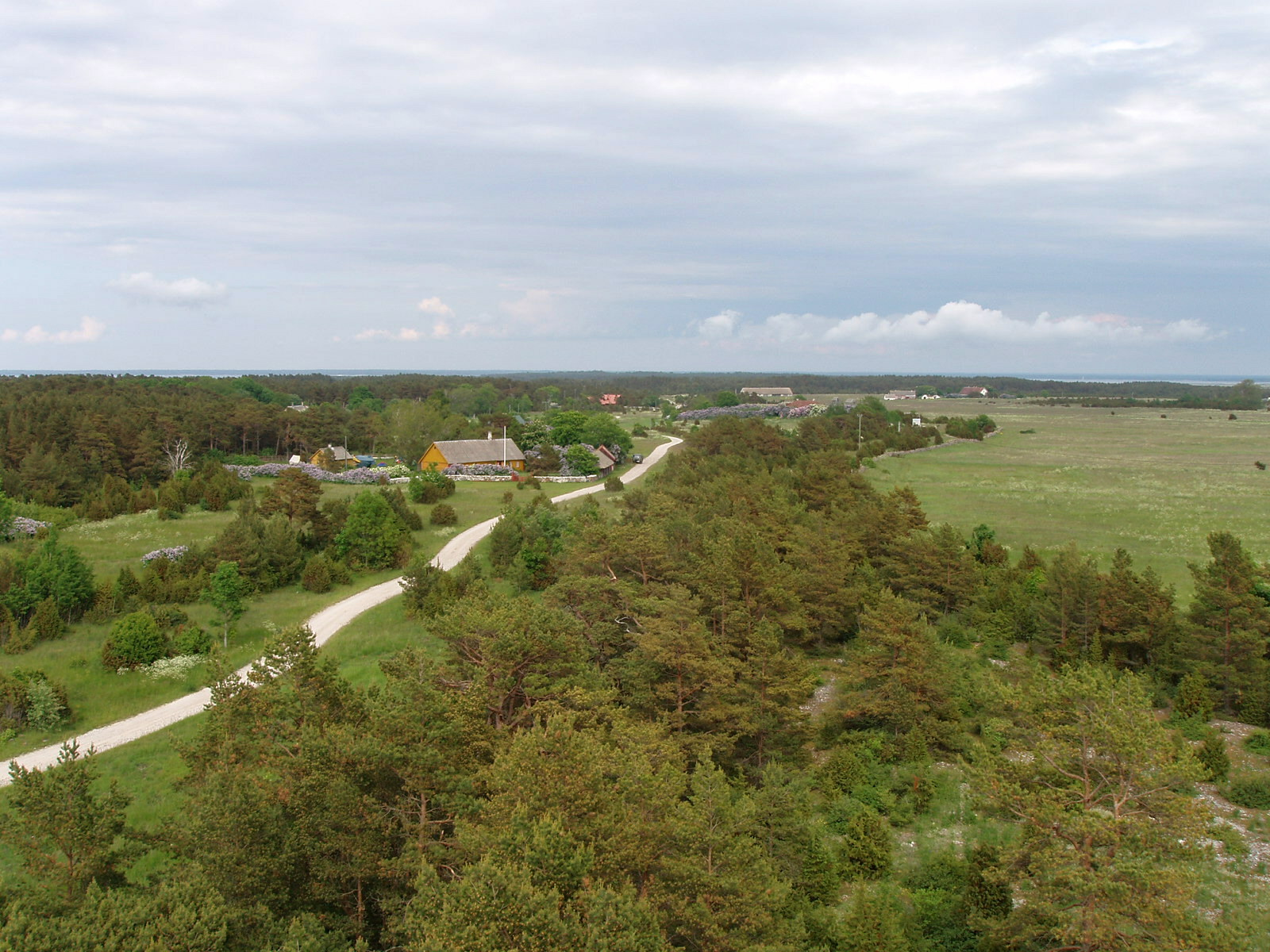
Countryside on Vilsandi

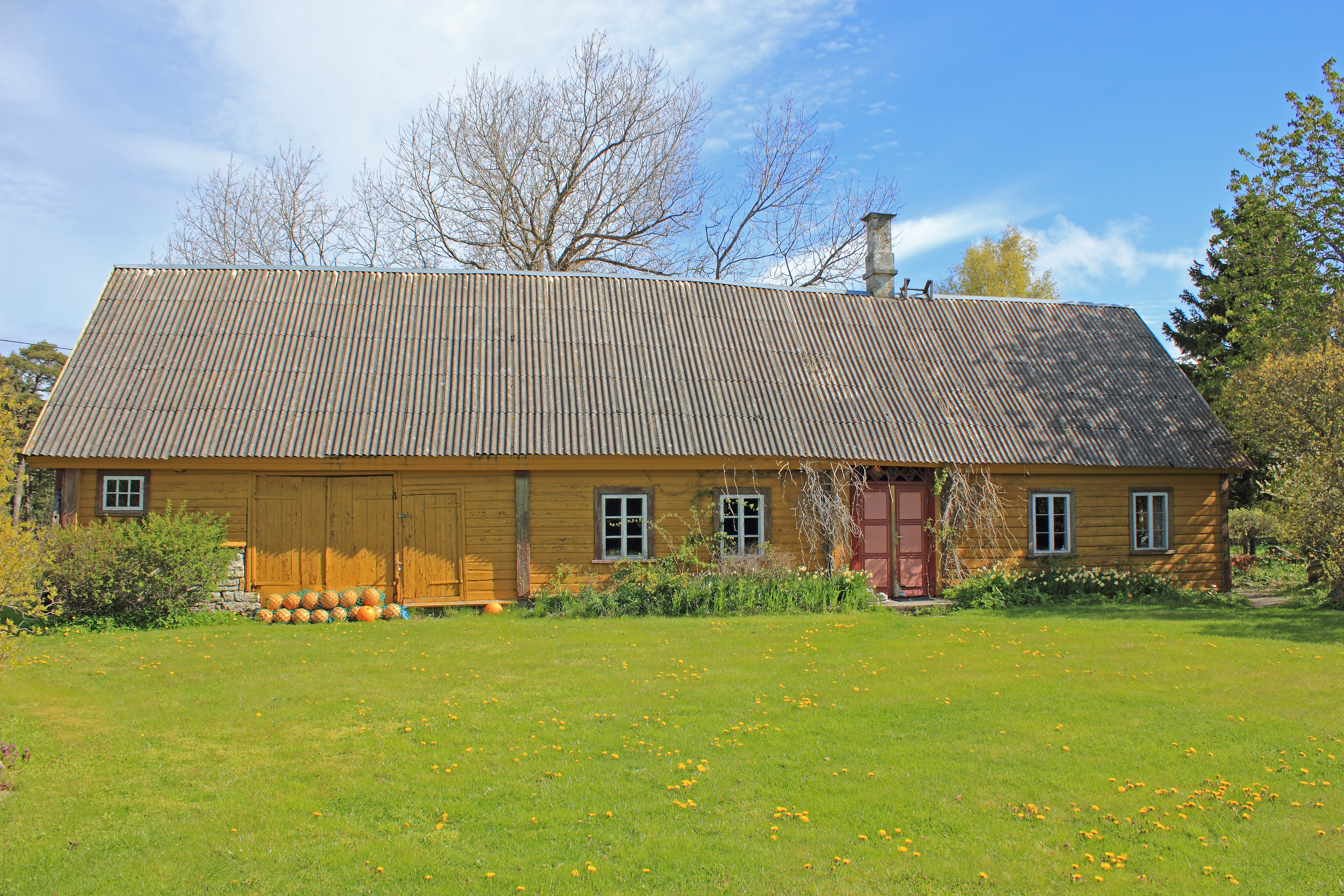
Farmhouse on Vilsandi

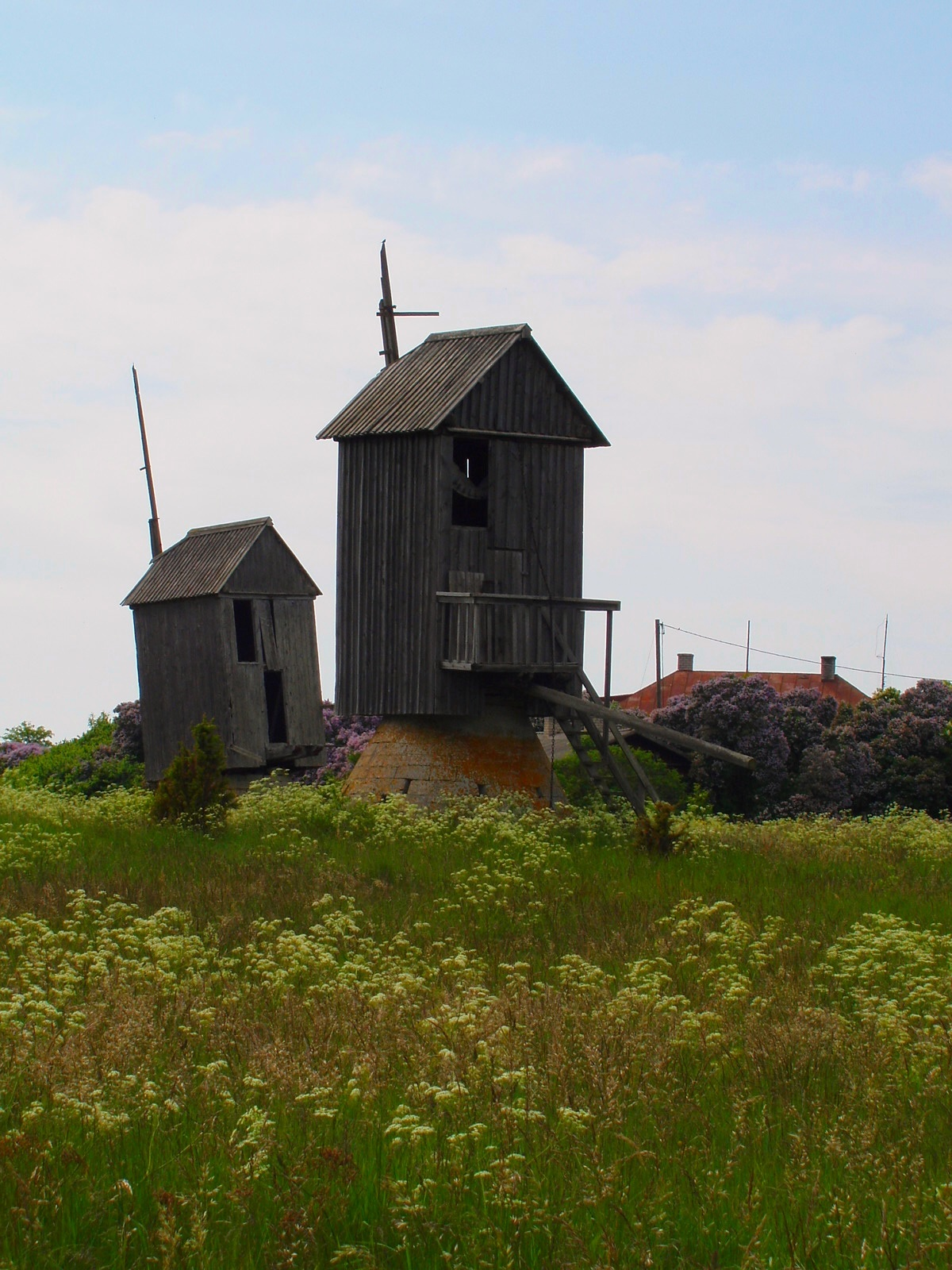
Windmills on Vilsandi

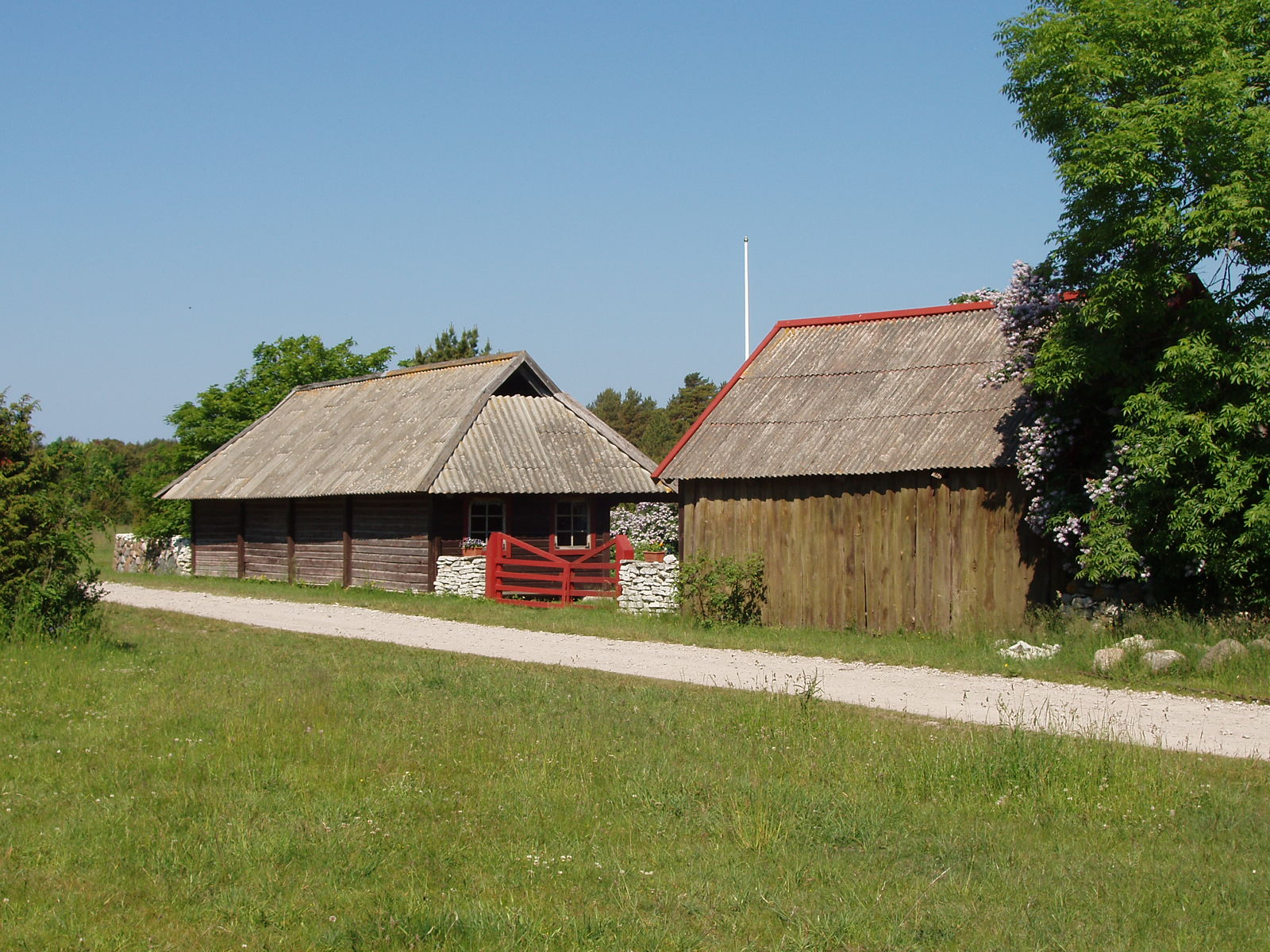
Vilsandi farmhouse

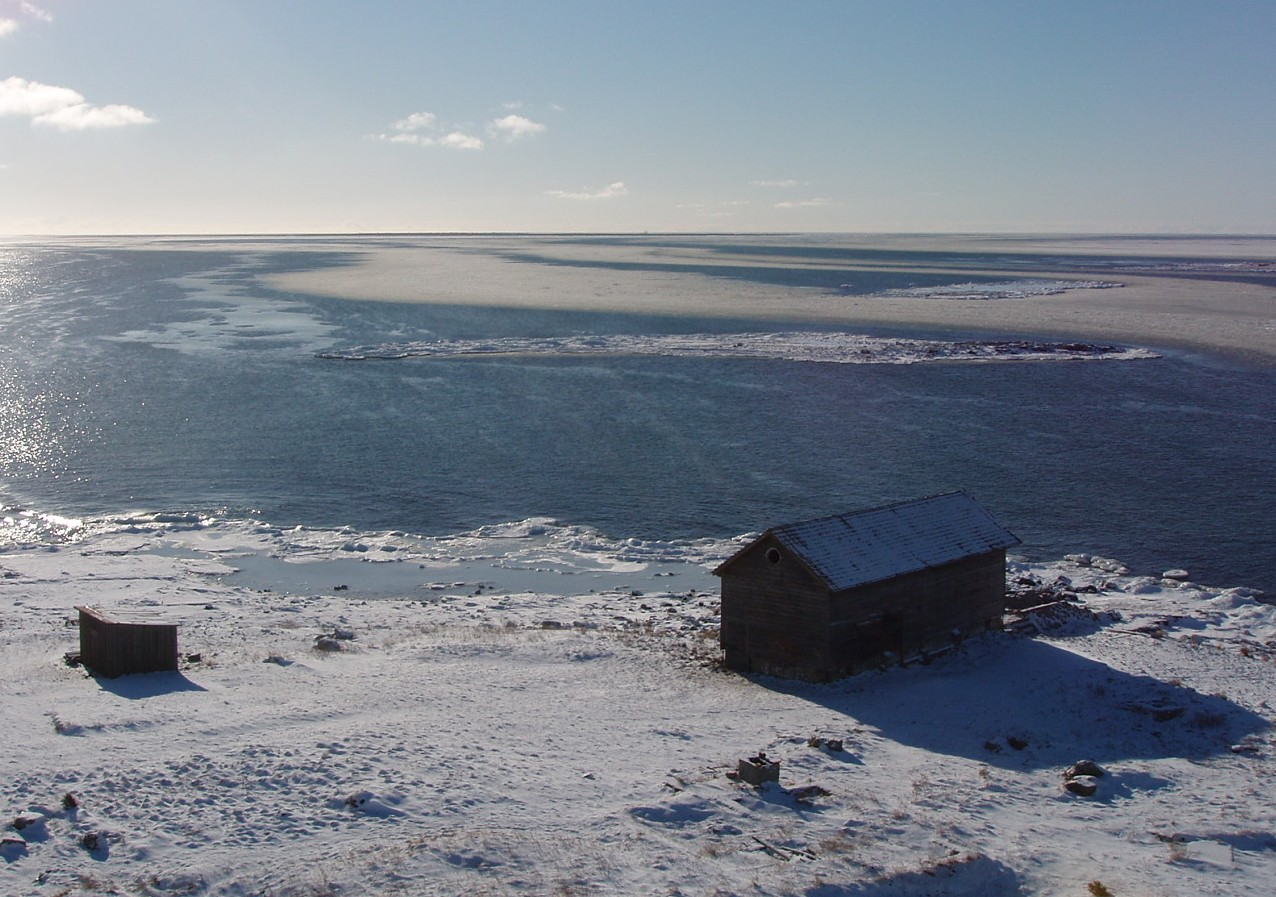
Vilsandi Station, rescue boat house in winter

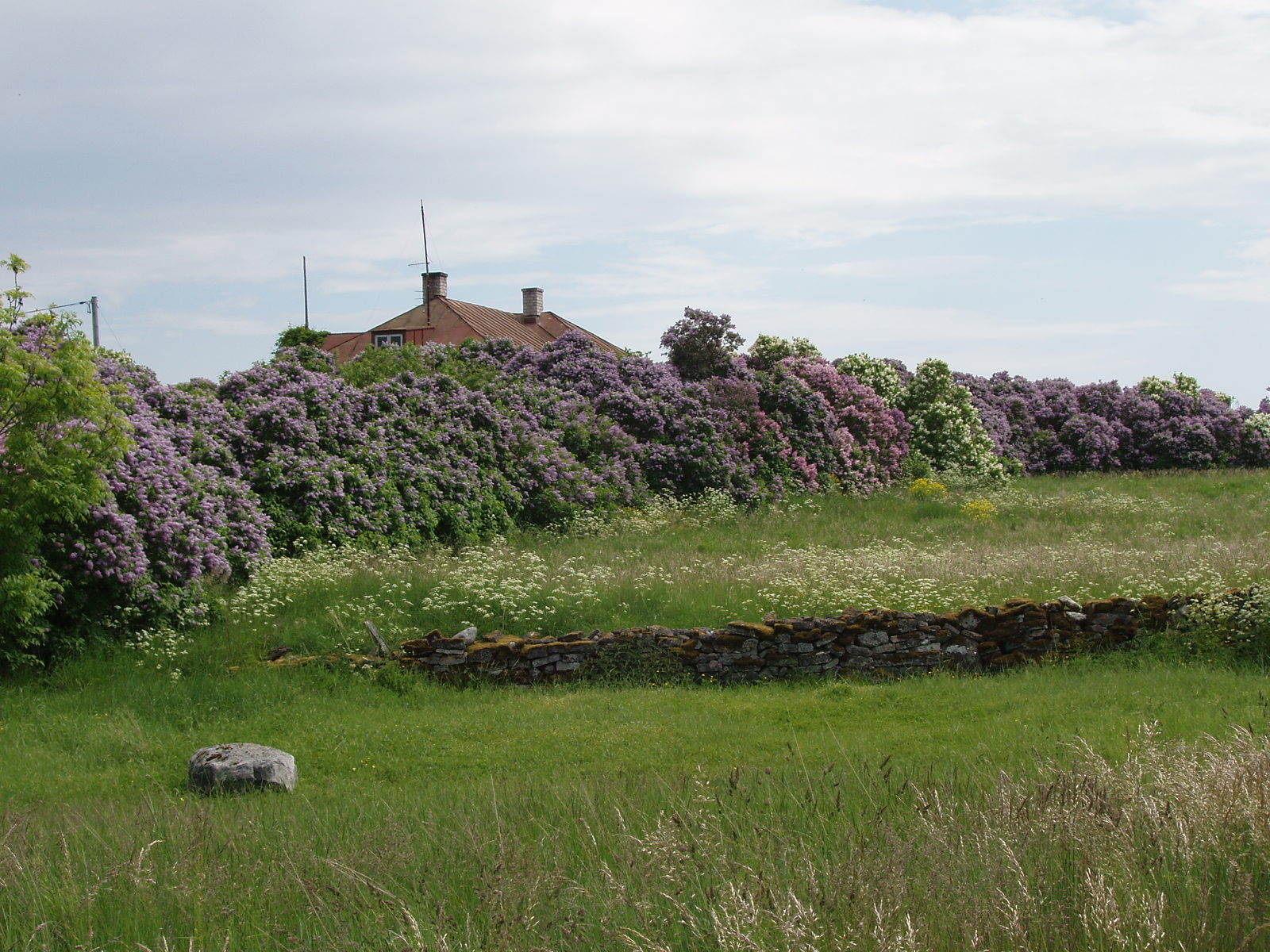
Lilac hedge and stone wall on a Vilsandi farm

== See also ==
- List of islands of Estonia
