= Ajemian =

Ajemian (Armenian: Աճեմյան, classical orthography: Աճէմեան) is an Armenian surname.

== People ==
Notable people with the surname include:

=== Ajemian ===
- Anahid Ajemian (1924–2016), American violinist
- Jerard Ajemian, Lebanese Armenian footballer
- Kevork Ajemian (1932–1998), French writer, journalist and activist
- Maro Ajemian (1921–1978), American classical pianist
- Vardan Ajemian (1905–1977), Armenian Soviet theatre director and actor

=== Achemian ===
- Mkrtich Achemian (1838–1917), Armenian poet

=== Adjemian ===
- Martín Adjemián (1932–2006), Argentine actor
- Vartan Adjemian or Vardan Adjemyan (born 1956), Armenian composer

=== Acemoğlu ===
(Turkified version of this surname)

- Daron Acemoglu (born 1967), American economist

== See also ==
- Agemian
