= Loonalaid =

Island in Estonia

Loonalaid (Swedish: Letenholm, German: Lettenholm) is a small island in the Baltic Sea belonging to the country of Estonia. Its coordinates are 58°19′42″N 21°48′19″E. Loonalaid lies just off the northwest coast of the island of Saaremaa, and is administratively part of Atla village in Saaremaa Parish, Saare County (Estonian: Saare maakond) and is also part of Vilsandi National Park.

Loonalaid is a windswept, rocky, low-lying 1 km^{2} islet west of Vilsandi in the westernmost part of Estonia. The islet is exposed to the Baltic Sea's predominantly westerly winds and weather systems. Historically, the area had many shipwrecks due to the winds, weather and numerous uncharted shoals. These were a hazard, particularly to ships accessing the Gulf of Riga, off the southern tip of Saaremaa.

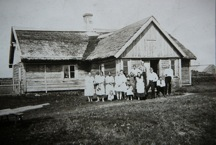
Peeter All's family farm on Loonalaid in the 1920s

During the days of serfdom, Loonalaid and adjacent areas of Saaremaa (called Oesel/Ösel by the Germans) belonged to the Loona Manor, owned by Baron Hoyningen-Huene. In 1830 Baron Huene sent a man by the name of Aadu All to live on Loonalaid, primarily to guard the hay that was grown there as feed for the manor's livestock and to prevent it from being stolen or burned. All, his wife and young son Peeter, who was 1 yr old at the time, became the islet's first residents and built a farmhouse. Peeter All became a seaman and businessman and eventually purchased the family farm from the Baron.

== See also ==
- List of islands of Estonia
