= Ariel Agemian =

Armenian artist (1904–1963)

Ariel Agemian Knight of Saint Gregory
- Հարություն "Արիել" Ստեփանի Աճեմյան
- Born: 1904; Bursa, Ottoman Empire
- Died: 1963 (aged 58–59)
- Education: Accademia di Belle Arti di Venezia

Haroutin "Ariel" Pascale Agemian (Armenian: Հարություն "Արիել" Ստեփանի Աճեմյան, 1904– November 28, 1963) was an Armenian-American artist who worked predominantly in Italy, France, and New York City in the United States.

== Life ==
Of Armenian descent, Agemian was originally from Bursa, Turkey, and graduated from the Accademia di Belle Arti di Venezia with a Gold Medal Award from the Associazione Artistica in 1926. During the Armenian genocide, Agemian witnessed his father get killed. He was then separated from his family and sent to Venice for study. Up to 1931, he worked and taught in Italy and from 1931 to 1938 in Paris. Agemian was a representative of the school of academic realism and a skillful master of composition. He painted national themes reflecting the ancient as well as the contemporary history of the Armenian people, frequently inspired by the distinct decorative-allegorical paintings of the Italian Renaissance. Agemian was also a portraitist and a landscapist. He has painted murals with spiritual as well as secular themes. They can be found in Armenian Catholic and Eastern Rite Catholic Churches in France, Italy, Turkey, and in America in New York City, Belmont, and Indian Orchard, Massachusetts. In addition to those works, there are paintings in the Mekhitarist College in Venice, the Monastery on the Island of San Lazzaro degli Armeni and also several homes of friends in the United States.

== Career in art ==
His artistic career started in France. During the period 1931 to 1938, his paintings were widely exhibited in Paris, Vienna, Venice, and Milan. He was primarily concerned with religious art and profane subjects. He began to paint prolifically after resigning as art professor at the College Moorat in Sèvres, France. Agemian's mural technique reflected the influence of Old Masters such as Titian. As time went on, he showed himself to be versatile, equally at home with small compositions as well as monumental murals. Subjects included portraits, still life, landscapes, nudes, figures and battle scenes. His portraits were of dignitaries from the political, religious, and entertainment world. They included Giovanni Martinelli, Akim Tamiroff's wife, Louis Martin, Minister of the French Navy, Pope Pius XI, and Cardinal Grégoire-Pierre Agagianian. He is most well known for the "Face of Christ" painted in 1935 and based on the negative of the Shroud of Turin.

Agemian, who was a religious man, was still nourishing the seed of a priestly vocation. He also wanted to spend some time in America and study the American people for a series of tableaux on democracy. Thus his decision to spend several months in the United States. This move in 1938 signalled the start of a new era for the young artist. An art exhibit in 1939 in New York was described as one of the most extraordinary assemblages to be seen on art gallery row in a long time. Critics proclaimed that “the artist reveals a diversifying talent with the ability to deal with formal organization; a nice color sense; and a generally romantic approach” and that he was "obviously trained in European traditions of sound craftsmanship".

Shortly after Ariel Agemian emigrated to America, he set up a studio in New York City where he taught art to now famous artists, Erik Schmidt and Richard Mantia while he continued to paint. He perfected the use of pastels on construction and working with the dark to light concept with the Chiaroscuro effect. On black construction he used white chalk and brought life from the black background. Ariel married Maria Roxas in June, 1939. They had a son, Stefan, and a daughter, Annig.

In 1943 Agemian became an American citizen and began to work for Msgr. Joseph F. Stedman and then Msgr. Frey who were directors of the Confraternity of the Precious Blood, a publishing house for Catholic literature in Brooklyn, New York. Agemian painted over 500 illustrations. They are in the books, My Daily Psalms, Christ in the Gospel, The Imitation of Christ, My Meditation on the Gospel and My Mass. His reproduction of Christ, from the Shroud of Turin, is considered the most exact by experts in the scientific research field. After coming to America, the artist's technique and subject matter noticeably changed to purely religious. Only a few portraits of dear friends were painted during the next twenty years. He sketched daily, lived somewhat the life of a recluse and his works were not displayed publicly again after 1939.

In 1958, Ariel Agemian was given the highest honor bestowed upon a layman by the Catholic Church. He was awarded a Gold Medal from Pope Pius XII and knighted into the Order of Saint Gregory the Great. On March 10, 2012, Ariel Agemian was posthumously awarded a distinguished alumni honor as an artist given by the Mekhatarian Alumni Association in Toronto, Canada.

Agemian died on November 28, 1963 in New York City.

== Legacy ==
His legacy lives on in his works. There have been several showings in the Grand Junction and Glenwood Springs area in Colorado. Some religious works have been donated to museums in New York City, Holy Cross Armenian Catholic Church in Belmont, Massachusetts; St. Mark's in Wynnewood, Pennsylvania; St. Bernard's Church in New Broomfield, Pennsylvania; Collegio Armeno in Rome; and Yerevan, Armenia. In 2011, the painting Christ in the Temple, dedicated to the "Son of God coming into the Temple" feast in the Armenian Apostolic Church and Eastern Catholic Church, was donated to Anna Maria College in Paxton, Massachusetts, also his daughter's alma mater. The majority of works done in America have been in the private collection of Annig Agemian Raley in Glenwood Springs, Colorado. The latest exhibition was in January, 2014 at the new Glenwood Springs Library in Glenwood Springs, Colorado. Just recently another of Agemian's portraits have been located in Ruben Sevak Museum, an art museum located in Vagharshapat, Armenia. Opened on 10 September 2013.
