= Merilaid & Co. =

Estonian shipping company

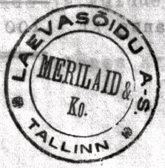
Corporate seal of the company

A/S Merilaid & Co. was an Estonian shipping company. The firm was founded in Tallinn, Estonia on 18 February 1930. There were seven founding shareholders, most of whom were related by blood or marriage as descendants of Peeter All. Of the 7 founders, 6 were ship captains and 5 had worked in the Far East, in Vladivostok and/or Shanghai, for many years, and had avoided the turmoil of the Bolshevik or Communist Revolution, prior to returning home to a free Estonia. Estonia had been part of the Russian Empire since 1721 when Russia defeated Sweden in the Great Northern War. After World War I, and concurrent with the Russian Civil War, Estonia defeated Russia in the 1918–1920 War of Independence and became an autonomous nation after almost 200 years of Russian rule.

== Founding shareholders ==
The three principal founders of Merilaid & Co. were Peter Mender, Paul Tever and Herman Soone. The seven founding shareholders and their shareholdings are shown below.

Founding shareholders	Ownership (%)
Mender, Peter (1883–1969) – a Master Mariner, and his wife Adelaide	24
Küll, Karl P. (1875–1937) – a Master Mariner, businessman, and husband of Peter Mender's older sister Rosalie	20
Tever, Paul (1870–1939) – an entrepreneur from Tartu, and his wife Luise	18
Kalmar, Johann (1884–1966) – a Master Mariner; Peter Mender's first cousin	12
Roos, Siim (1883–1934) – a Master Mariner and husband of Peter Mender's sister Albertine	12
Soone, Herman (1875–1942) – a Master Mariner	8
Mänder, Johannes (1896–1976) – a Master Mariner; Peter Mender's younger brother	6
Total	100

Aside from Tever and Soone, all founding shareholders were from Vilsandi Island or nearby islands. All of them except Küll and Mänder had lived and worked in Vladivostok. Mender, Kalmar, and Roos had also lived and worked in Shanghai.

Merilaid principally owned and operated four coal-powered steamships. SS Merisaar was acquired in 1930, SS Naissaar in 1933, SS Kuressaar in 1935 and SS Osmussaar in 1936. The captain of each of Merilaid's ships was usually one of the founding shareholders. Merilaid's ships carried cargos all over the world. Table 1 provides some information about each of the ships. The company also had interests in, and managed, various short-sea vessels. Merilaid's ships were painted black and their funnels, or smoke stacks, had a narrow blue band near the top.

== Table 1 – Ships owned by Merilaid ==
Except as otherwise noted, all information in Table 1 has been sourced from Miramar ship index and the Starke / Schnell registries.

Name of ship (yr. acquired)	Date built (mo./yr.)	Shipyard	Tonnage	Length (ft.)	Beam (ft.)	Previous or subsequent names (yr.)	Ultimate fate
MERISAAR (1930)	July 1900	ST Triestino, San Marco, Austria-Hungary	2,348	290	42	ANNA GOICH (1900)	Attacked by U99 in July 1940 and sunk by Luftwaffe aircraft off the Irish coast a few days later at 51N 14W
NAISSAAR (1933)	Nov 1911	J. Crown & Sons, Monkwearmouth, UK	1,879	268	38	FORD CASTLE (1911)	Expropriated by USSR in 1940. Sunk in Gulf of Finland in Aug 1941 after striking a mine & being bombed by Luftwaffe aircraft
KURESSAAR (1935)	Mar 1914	Mackay Bros, Alloa, UK	2,196	285	42.6	INVERAWE (1914) MERIDA (1941) ADONIS (1956)	Sold to an Italian firm in 1956. Sunk in Feb. 1960 off Otranto, Italy (40.09.45N 18.31.30E) while towing a barge.
OSMUSSAAR (1936)	April 1909	Craig, Taylor & Co, Stockton, UK	2,173	287	44	MAGDALENA (1909) DUDDINGTON (1922)	Expropriated by USSR in 1940. Broken up for scrap in 1964.

While Merilaid was the majority owner and operator of these four steamships, each ship also had minority shareholders that were individual investors. The names of people who held an interest in the Kuressaar, Naissaar and Osmussaar are shown in Table 2. The specific holdings of these individuals is unavailable, nor is similar information available for Merisaar. A personal visit to the archives of the Estonian ship registry is required for more information.

== Table 2 – List of minority shareholders in the ships majority owned by Merilaid & Co. ==
From the archives of the Estonian Maritime Museum

SS Kuressaar	SS Naissaar	SS Osmussaar
Harkman, Adelaide (Mender's daughter) Jaldre, Mardo (Tever's nephew) Klasen, Erika (Mender's daughter) Koshemäkin, Johann Küll, Harry-William (K. P. Küll's son) Küll, Karl Voldemar (K.P. Küll's son) Mänder, Johannes Roos, Albertine (Mender's sister and S. Roos's wife) Sepp, Ellen (K. P. Küll's daughter) Soone, Herman Soone, Lydia (H. Soone's daughter) Tauben, Johann Teever, Aksel Tever, Luise Tever, Paul Tõlk, Albert Tuimaa, Selma-Anette (K. P.Küll's daughter)	Jakobson, Maxim Jakobson, Raissa Klasen, Erika (P. Mender's daughter.) Koshemäkin, Helmi (J. Koshemäkin's wife) Küll, Karl Voldemar (K. P. Küll's son.) Mänder, Johannes Mender, Adelaide (Mender's wife) Paal, Liine Roos, Albertine (Mender's sister and Siim Roos's wife) Sepp, Ellen (K. P. Küll's daughter) Soone, Johanna (H. Soone's wife) Tauben, Johannes Tever, Luise	Harkman, Erich (Mender's son-in-law) Jaldre, Mardo (Tever's nephew) Kelder, Ksenia Koshemäkin, Johann Küll, Karl Voldemar (K. P. Küll's son) Lohk, Hans Mender, Peter Mänder, Johannes Paal, Liine Roos, Albertine (Mender's sister and Siim Roos's wife) Soone, Herman Teever, Aksel Tever, Paul Torpan, Herman (Merilaid's accountant.) Tõlk, Albert

== Details of ships ==
Some pictures and other details about each ship are provided below.

=== SS Merisaar ===
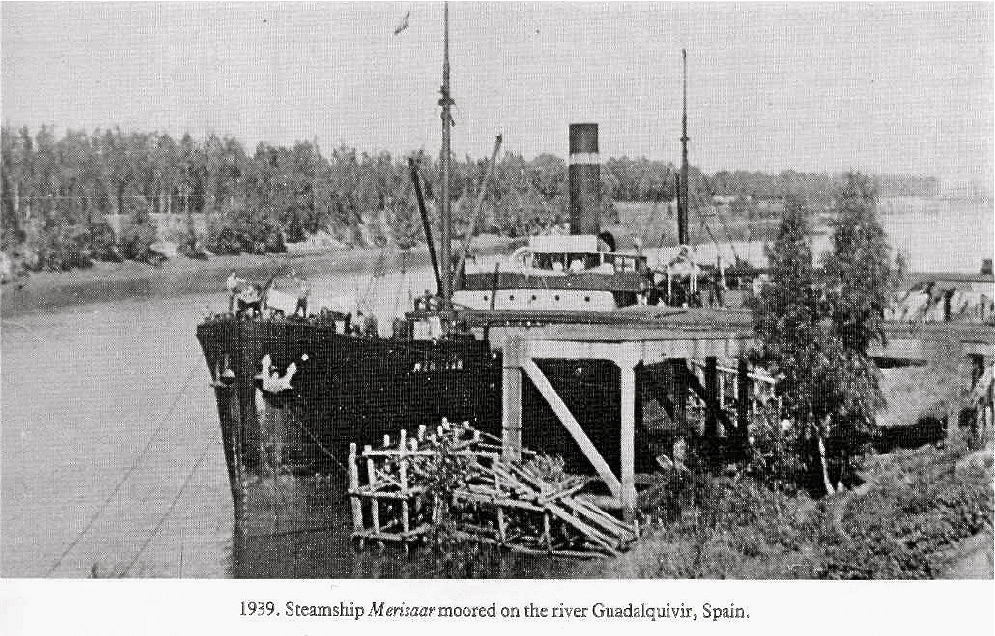
SS Merisaar 1939

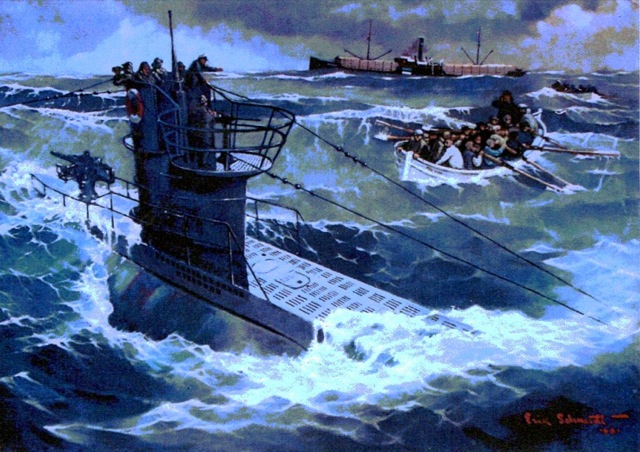
"Merisaarele" E Schmidt's 1981 painting

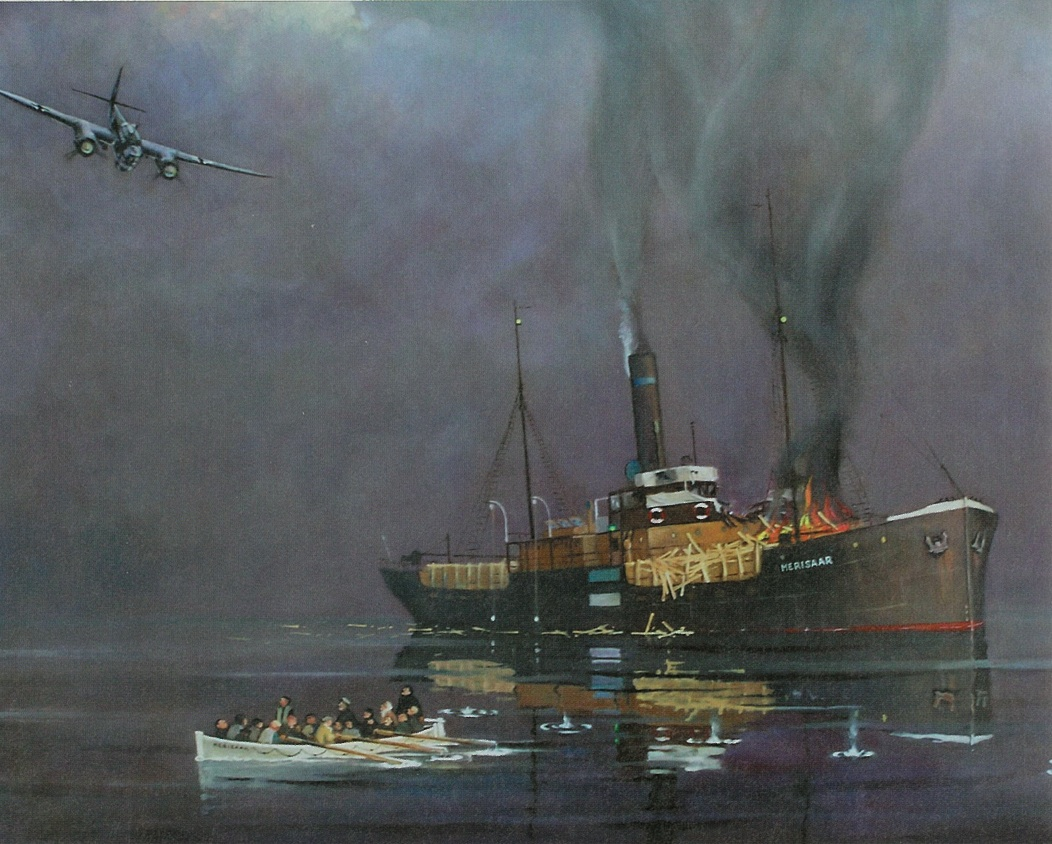
"Merisaar" E Schmidt's 1991 painting

The Merisaar was a 2,348-ton merchant steamer built in Austria-Hungary in 1900. She was 290 ft. long with a breadth of 42 ft. and 18 ft. of draught. Originally named Anna Goich, she was sold to Estonian interests after WWI and after Merilaid acquired the ship in 1930 she was renamed Merisaar. Merisaar's home port of Tallinn is clearly seen in aft views of the ship.

On June 23, 1940, Merisaar left New Orleans for Cork, Ireland with a cargo of timber. In the North Atlantic Ocean, late in the evening of July 12, 1940, German submarine U-99 attacked Merisaar with one torpedo, which missed. About an hour later another torpedo was fired but this also missed, as the seas were very rough. The U-boat then forced the ship to stop by using its 20mm gun, and the German commander ordered the ship to proceed to Bordeaux, France, that was under German control. A few days later, on the evening of July 14, Merisaar was strafed by a Luftwaffe Heinkel He 111 bomber. The 26 crewmembers lowered the life rafts and abandoned ship, rowing away as fast as they could. On its next run the aircraft dropped a bomb on the engine room and the ship caught fire and sank off Queenstown, Ireland. The entire crew survived and was left with about 120 miles to row to shore. A French fishing trawler found them two days later and took them to Lorient, France. After three months' internment in a German camp the ship's captain, August Schmidt (1883–1974), and crew were released.

In 1991 Capt. Schmidt's son, artist Erik Schmidt (15.8.1925-18.4.2014), created a painting showing the German bomber attacking Merisaar and donated it to the Estonian Maritime Museum. Erik Schmidt's painting "Merisaarele" is donated by Einar Sanden to korp! Sakala's convent house in Tartu.

=== SS Naissaar ===
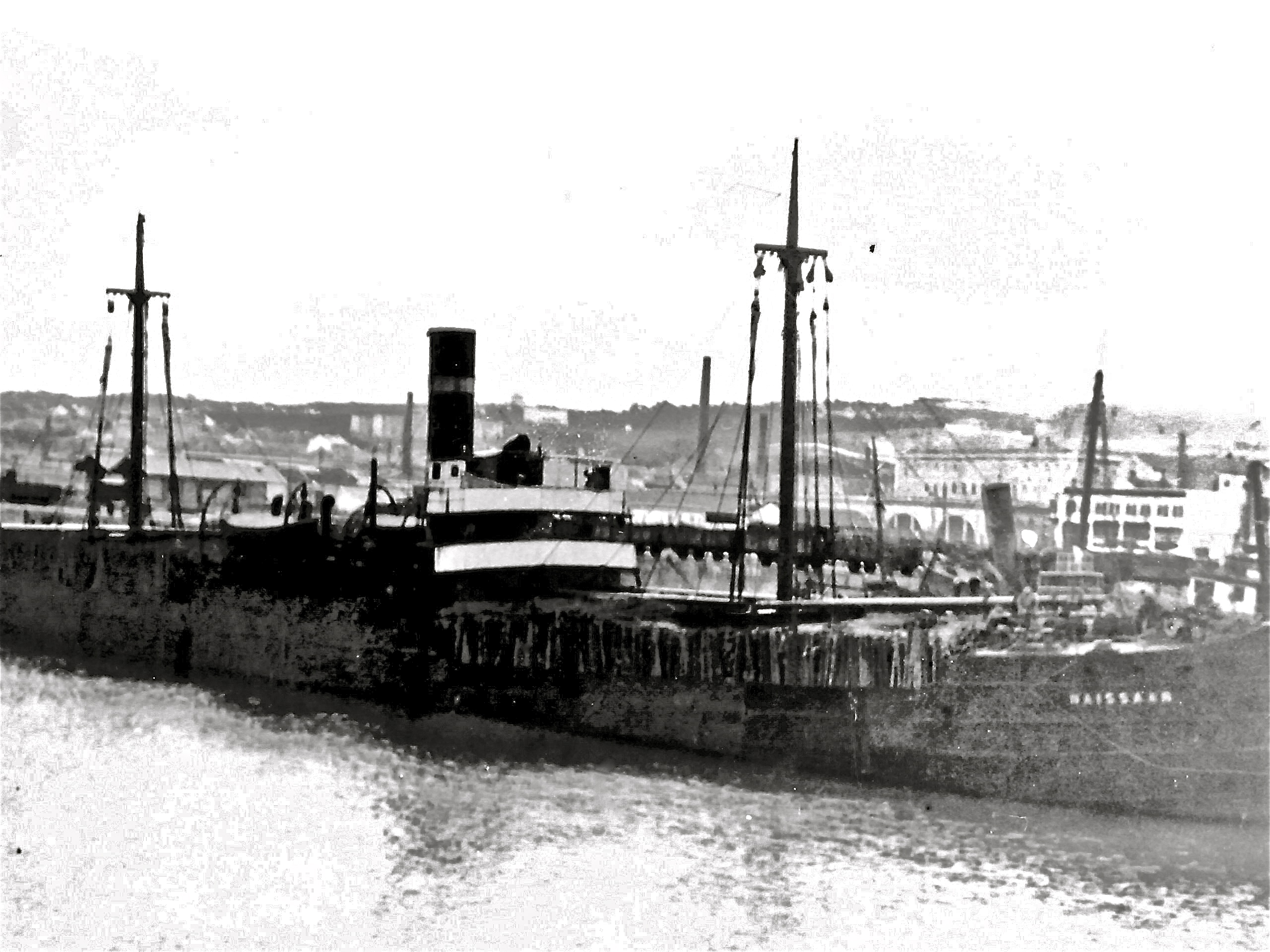
SS Naissaar

The Naissaar was built in Great Britain in 1911 and was originally named Ford Castle. After Capt. Roos returned to Estonia from China he helped Merilaid identify suitable ships to acquire, and the Ford Castle was purchased in 1933. The ship was renamed Naissaar and Johann Kalmar, who had returned from Shanghai to Estonia in 1932, became her captain.

After the Soviets annexed Estonia in 1940, Naissaar was expropriated by the USSR and was operated by the newly created Estonian State Shipping Company. On August 29, 1941, while in a convoy from Tallinn to St. Petersburg, she struck a mine east of Mohni Island, Estonia and was then bombed and destroyed by Luftwaffe aircraft.

=== SS Kuressaar ===
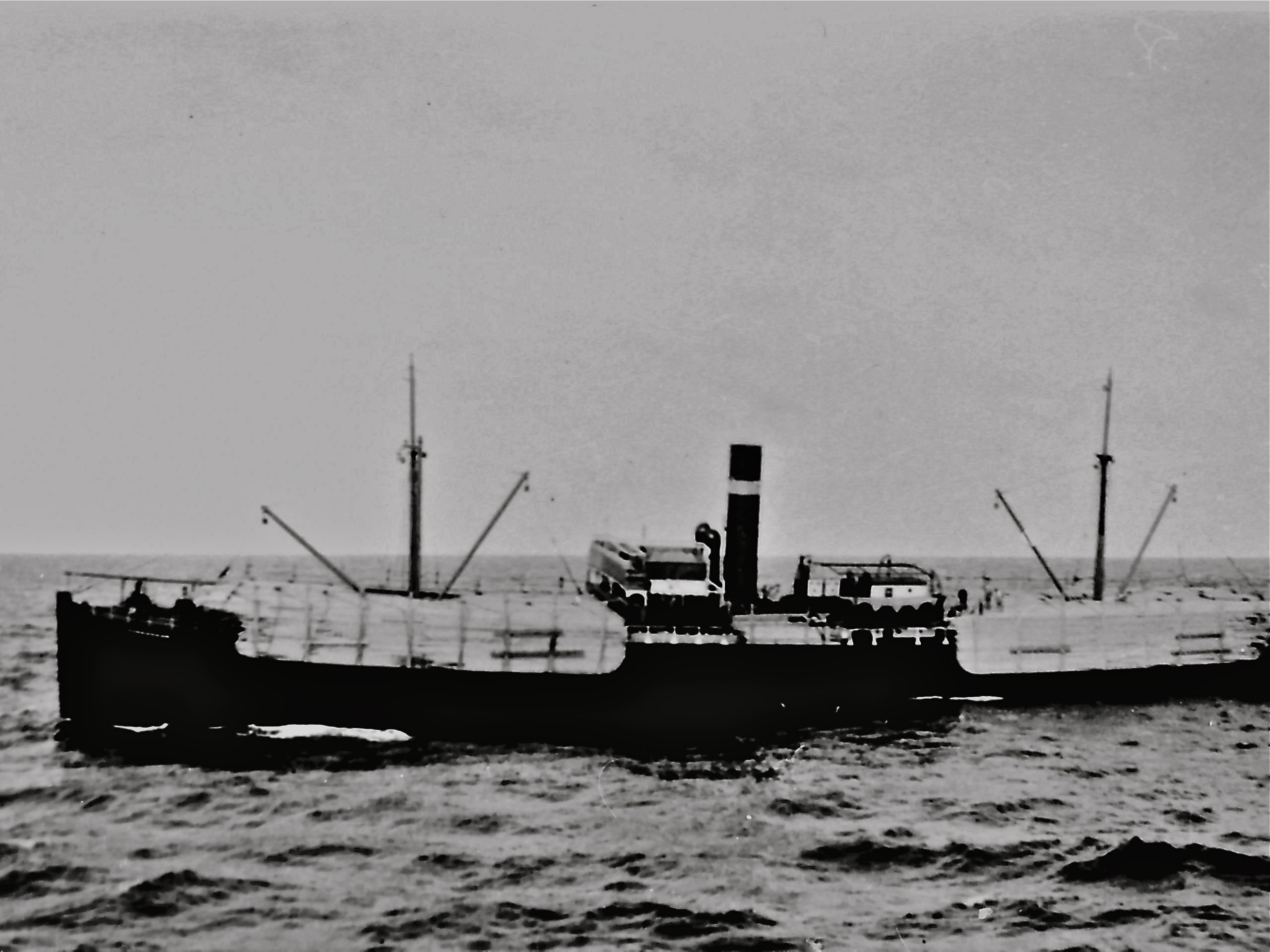
SS Kuressaar

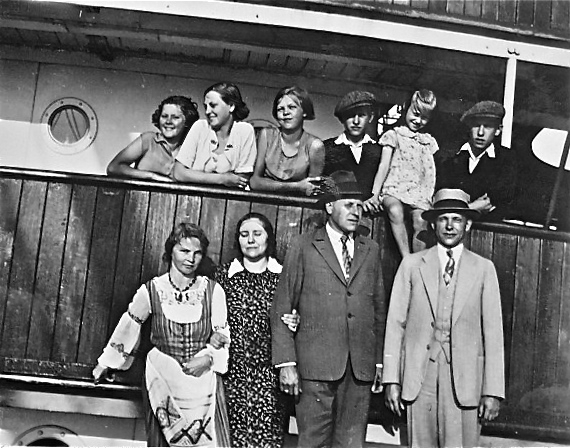
Foredeck of SS Kuressaar, 1936

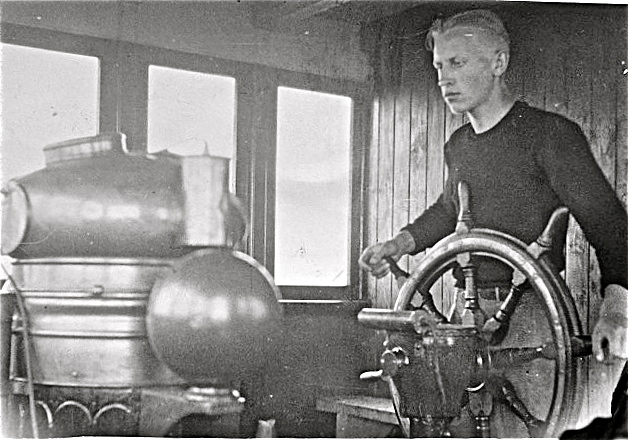
I. Kalmar on SS Kuressaar in 1938.

In 1935 Johann Kalmar went to England and, under Merilaid's authorization, found and negotiated the purchase of a suitable ship built in the U.K. in 1914 called Inverawe. Merilaid renamed this ship Kuressaar and Kalmar became her captain until early 1940 when he took the ship to England where Capt. August Tarius was to take Kuressaar to the U.S.

On June 21, 1940 the U.S.S.R. invaded the Republic of Estonia and on August 6, 1940 they annexed Estonia and the other Baltic nations. The Soviets installed new governments and had these communist governments issue decrees nationalizing all industrial and commercial enterprises, including transportation companies, and expropriating their assets without compensation. The communist governments also attempted to get title and control over various ships owned privately by Estonian, Latvian and Lithuanian interests that had been in foreign waters when the decrees were issued. The U.S. did not recognize the occupation of the Baltic Republics by the U.S.S.R. and froze the transfer of all assets owned by Baltic nationals so the Soviets could not benefit from them. The U.S. also affirmed its recognition of Johannes Kaiv, the existing Consul General of the Republic of Estonia in New York, as the lawful representative of Estonia in the U.S.

One of the ships that the newly annexed Estonian Soviet Socialist Republic tried to claim ownership and control of through American courts was the Kuressaar, that was lying in Baltimore harbor. Various lawsuits were heard regarding the ownership of this vessel including A/S Merilaid & Co. v. Chase Natl. Bank, 189 Misc. 285, 71 N.Y.S.2d 377 (Sup.Ct.N.Y.County 1947).

Anticipating the Soviet claim, Estonia's Consul General, Kaiv, had already organized a new company, Estoduras Steamship Company Inc., registered in the Honduras, and transferred title of Kuressaar to this entity in order to preserve the ship for her original owner, Merilaid & Co. American courts did not recognize the Soviet claims made on this ship and ownership of the vessel remained with Estoduras. Somewhat ironically, Soviet attempts to get control over other Estonian vessels continued to 1943, even though by this time Germany had invaded Estonia and had taken control of the country from the Russians.

Estoduras changed the name of the ship to SS Mérida and continued to own and operate the ship, largely under the auspices of Peter Mender and his son-in-law Erich Harkna (1911–1991), who both lived in the U.S.

Some years later, Johannes Mänder, who lived in Sweden, wished to manage Mérida from Stockholm and sought support for this from other Swedish-Estonian shareholders, including a group led by Arved Mägi.

According to Mägi's memoirs, an agreement was eventually made with Harkna to transfer control of the Mérida. The total cost for doing so grew to about £250,000 and comprised £100,000 for the ship plus the assumption of various other liabilities, which the Swedish Estonians financed through equity, loans and personal guarantees. This was an unexpectedly large amount and fortunately the subsequent 1956 Suez Crisis resulted in charter rates increasingly substantially. After a few charters from Portugal to England with a cargo of cast iron, Mérida earned enough to repay all of the loans and have monies left over to refurbish the ship. At this time some of the ship's shareholders, and perhaps also those that were shareholders in Mägi's company, Ola de Navegación Estoco S.A. of Panama City, that held the majority interest, wanted to sell their shares. Mänder wasn't among the sellers but wasn't a buyer himself, and Mägi's group ended up acquiring all of the shares in Mérida that they didn't already own. However, Lydia Soone, the daughter of Capt. Soone, one of Merilaid's founders, had by then completed her sentence in Siberia, returned to Estonia and retained a lawyer. Mägi ended up making a deal that resulted in Lydia Soone exchanging her interest in the Mérida for the house owned by Arved Mägi's parents in Tallinn, with his parents being able to live on the lower level of the home as long as they wished.

The ship continued to generate attractive profits but as she was old and in need of a major overhaul, the cost of which was uncertain, the ship was sold to a Greek firm. Mägi writes that their experience with the Mérida turned out very profitably .

As a footnote, Mägi turned out to be an unscrupulous ship-owner who ended up in jail for committing insurance fraud for the 1950 sabotage and sinking of SS Energi, in which 10 crewmembers were killed. While this event raised some suspicions at the time, there was no evidence to disprove the subsequent investigation's plausible conclusion that the ship had struck an old WWII mine and then sunk. It wasn't until 15 years later that additional information came to light, primarily from a confession, that dynamite had been placed on board the ship and had been the cause of her fate, and Mägi and his accomplices went to jail.

=== SS Osmussaar ===
Osmussaar was built in the U.K. in 1909 and was originally named Magdalena. The ship was requisitioned by the U.S. government and operated under the U.S. flag in 1918-1919. In 1922 she was renamed Duddington. Merilaid acquired the ship in 1936, renamed her Osmussaar and Johannes Mänder became her captain.

After the U.S.S.R. annexed Estonia in 1940, orders were issued instructing all Estonian ships to return to a Soviet port and that any captains disregarding this order would have their families held to account. In fall 1940, the recently married Johannes Mänder wanted to make it more difficult for the communists to make use of the Osmussaar and to follow the order, and he took the ship north to the port of Murmansk and turned it over to the Russian authorities there. He then returned to Estonia by rail. Ship registries for 1942 list the ship as being based in Vladivostok. Under Soviet control, Osmussaar was unchanged during WWII and then underwent post-war reconstruction. The Soviet Far Eastern Shipping Register 1880–2005 (Реестр судов ДВМП 1880–2005) lists the ship as belonging to the Soviet Northern Fleet from 1940 to 1943, the Far Eastern Shipping Fleet from 1943 to 1949 and then the Sakhalin Steam Ship Company, before being scrapped.

== The seven founders and their families ==
Founders' photos, where shown, are mainly from the 1940 book titled Mereteedelt by Capt. Evald Past.

=== Capt. Peter Mender (1883–1969) ===
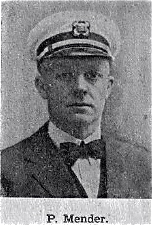

Peter Mender left Estonia in 1907 to find work in Vladivostok. While there he met an Estonian woman called Adelaide Lillestern and they married in 1912. Capt. Mender and Adelaide Mender (1893–1976) had three daughters, Erika Mender Kaldveer (1912–2003), Adelaide Mender Harkna (1915–1988) and Leida Mender Möldre (1920–1982). Mender left Vladivostok in 1919 and began work in Shanghai, where he stayed until early 1938. After returning to Estonia, Mender wrote a book about his life in the Far East.

Mender and his family fled to Sweden in 1944 and were able to fast-track their immigration to the U.S. where they arrived in 1946, presumably because Mender was a Standard Oil pensioner and had been awarded a U.S. Navy medal for his actions during the 1937 U.S.S. Panay incident.

Capt. Mender's five grandchildren and many great-grandchildren live in the U.S.

=== Capt. Siim Roos (1883–1934) ===
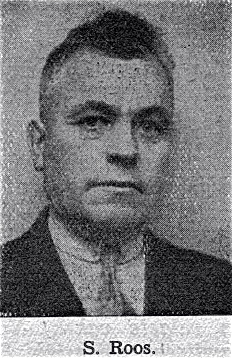

Siim Roos was the husband of Peter Mender's younger sister Albertine Mänder. They had two daughters, one born in Vladivostok and the other born in Shanghai. The Roos family lived in Shanghai from about 1920 until the early 1930s.

Capt. Roos was known to have a weak heart (angina pectoris). After returning to Estonia, Roos stayed ashore for some time because of his heart condition. However, he was keen to return to the sea one more time and promised his family that he would retire after one final voyage.

During October 1934 Merisaar delivered a cargo of cellulose from Tallinn to the port of St. Louis du Rhone, not far from Marseille, France. On November 2, 1934, Merisaar was on her return journey to Tallinn, having picked up a cargo of salt from Torrevieja, Spain, when one of the ship's officers, Karl V. Küll, discovered Capt. Roos' body while coming off his watch about 25 miles east of Gibraltar. Roos had died from a heart attack. At the same time, Naissaar under the command of Capt. Kalmar was on her way to Lisbon with a cargo of British coal. Merisaar went to Lisbon to meet them. In Lisbon, Roos' body was placed in a metal-lined casket that was then soldered shut, as was customary to contain decay in unrefrigerated conditions, and Capt. Kalmar took command of Merisaar to bring his friend back home. The ship arrived in Tallinn in mid November and Roos was laid to rest in Tallinn's Rahumäe cemetery on November 18, 1934.

Roos's widow and two daughters were able to flee Estonia during WWII and both daughters settled in the U.S. One daughter, Aino Roos Tammerk (1920–2005) later immigrated to Canada to be closer to her daughter and three grandchildren. Capt. Roos's other daughter, Heljo Roos Võsari (1922–2008), wrote a book about her childhood in China, subsequent life in Estonia, and flight to Sweden as a war refugee before immigrating to settle in the U.S.

Capt. Roos' five grandchildren and five great-grandchildren live in the U.S. and Canada.

=== Capt. Johannes Mänder (1896–1976) ===
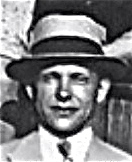
J. Mänder

Johannes Mänder, as far as is known, remained in Estonia and never worked in Vladivostok. Toward the end of WWII he and his wife Ksenia (1912–1999) fled Estonia for Sweden, where they remained. They had twin daughters.

Capt. Mänder is believed to have two grandchildren living in Sweden.

=== Capt. Johann Kalmar (1884–1966) ===
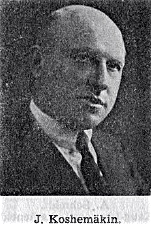

Kalmar's surname at birth was Koschemjäkin, which was often misspelled as Koshemäkin or Koshemakin by leaving out the silent letters. He changed the name to Kalmar in 1940 when the Estonian government encouraged people to change their surnames from those given to them by Baltic-German Barons during the nation's feudal history.

Estonia was part of the Russian Empire during the early 20th century. After Kalmar returned to Estonia from captaining fishing ships for C.J. Spahde & Co. in the Kara Sea, WWI had just begun. Kalmar was conscripted into the Russian Navy in 1914 and trained as a submarine navigator, but served as captain on several surface vessels supporting Russia's Baltic submarine fleet. After the start of the 1917 Russian Revolution, Kalmar was able to escape to the east, avoiding the Bolsheviks. He and his fiancé, Helmi Sild Kalmar (1894–1982), were married in Tomsk, Siberia in 1918 and continued to Vladivostok. In 1919, Kalmar sailed to Shanghai on the same ship as Peter Mender. In Shanghai, Kalmar and his wife and three children shared a home with the Roos family. Kalmar captained cargo ships, primarily for Moller & Co., until returning to Estonia in 1932.

In September 1944, Kalmar and some relatives left one of Estonia's westernmost islands on a fishing boat arranged for them by Peter Mender, who had reached Sweden earlier, and crossed the Baltic Sea without being stopped by Russian or German ships. Kalmar and his wife and daughter settled in Sweden. His two sons had left Estonia in 1942 to attend school in Germany under the auspices of an uncle. After the war they worked in American Red Cross camps and in 1948 were reunited with their parents and sister in Sweden. In 1950 both sons went to Australia to work for another uncle in construction jobs. After a few years, one son decided to stay there and the other immigrated to Canada.

Capt. Kalmar has two grandchildren and three great-grandchildren living in Canada and one grandchild living in Australia.

=== Capt. Karl P. Küll (1875–1937) ===
Karl Peter Küll was the husband of Peter Mender's older sister Rosalie Mänder (1881–1947). He was a ship captain and ended up in a senior position with one of Tallinn's major enterprises, called ETK, the central co operative connecting most of Estonia's consumer co-operatives. The business dealt with a multitude of products such as foods, spices, coffee, fuels, fish, and bicycles, including owning some metal works and a factory that made nails.

Küll and his wife had four children. One son died in the battle of Velikiye Luki during WWII. His other son, Karl Voldemar Küll (1915–1995), was an officer aboard the Merisaar and survived the 1940 German attack on the ship. After this incident, Karl V. Küll managed to flee Estonia with his wife and two children, first becoming a war refugee in Sweden and then immigrating to Canada. After having survived the North Atlantic during WWII and then having a comparatively good life in Canada, Küll drowned at age 80 in Lake Ontario while saving his dog from a similar fate.

One of Karl P. Küll's daughters, Selma Küll Tuimaa (1903–1962), emigrated from Estonia to Canada in 1936 and later moved to the U.S. His other daughter, Ellen Küll Sepp (1912–2004), immigrated to Canada via Sweden after WWII.

Karl P. Küll had five grandchildren and has five great-grandchildren living in Canada.

=== Capt. Herman Soone (1875–1942) ===
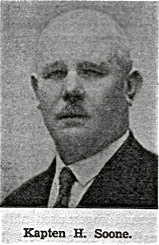

Soone was born in Rakvere, Estonia in 1875. The year he went to the Russian Far East to work is unknown but at the outbreak of the Russo Japanese War (1904–05) he was employed as captain of the SS Sungari, a steamship operated by the South Manchuria Railway, between the ports of Port Arthur (now Lushun, China), Chemulpo (now Incheon, South Korea) and Shanghai. The War began on February 8, 1904 and on February 9, the captains of several Russian vessels, including Sungari and the naval vessels Varyag and Korietz, decided to scuttle their ships to prevent them from falling into Japanese hands during what's known as the Battle of Chemulpo Bay. At the time, Sungari was carrying cargo of tea and French wine. On August 14, 1904 Sungari was raised by the Japanese and towed to Nagasaki.

Documents in Estonia's national archives, retrieved from Vladivostok, show that Soone held permits for 12 years, beginning in 1910, to catch and process fish in specific regions of the Far East. These regions bordered on the Kanchelan River and the eastern side of the Kamchatka Peninsula. These locations are more than 1,500 km apart. Many Estonian seaman sought work in the Far East prior to WWI as the Tsar wanted to settle the area and offered economic incentives to do so. The years Soone spent operating fishing vessels and fish processing camps in the Far East, including sailing across the Bering Sea as far as Nome, Alaska, are described in pp. 17–61 of a book by Evald Past (1900–1991) titled Mereteedelt, Vikerlane, Tallinn, 1940. Other records show that Soone owned a home in Tallinn at Koidula 12, near Kadriorg Palace, that he rented out, and that he was active with both community organizations and the Estonian Maritime Museum.

Soone is believed to have returned to Estonia during the 1930s. In 1941, Soone, along with his wife Johanna (1889–1941), daughter Lydia (b. 1914) and son Ilmar (b. 1923) were arrested and deported to Siberia. Deportation took place in railcars previously used to transport livestock. Males and females were segregated before deportation and were sent to different camps. Soone and his wife were thus sent to different camps, where each of them perished, his wife in 1941 and Soone in 1942. According to records, Soone's children survived the camps and were released in 1958 but only Lydia's return to Estonia is documented.

=== Paul Tever (1870–1939) ===
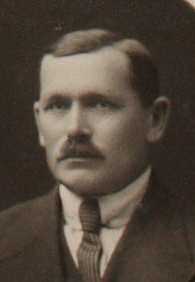
Paul Tever

Not much is known about Tever other than he was from Tartu and was an entrepreneur or merchant/businessman and not a seaman. In 1909 he married Luise Mitt (b. 1890). The previous year Tever had adopted his older sister's son, Aksel Teever (1898–1950), who had become orphaned at age 10.

In Vladivostok, Tever had a factory that made soap. When Tever wanted to leave and return home to Estonia, the authorities were reluctant to let him take his furniture and possessions with him. When Capt. Roos learned of this he convinced the Russians that under the 1920 Treaty of Tartu between Estonia and Russia, Tever was entitled to return home with all of his personal possessions.

Back in Estonia, Tever apparently owned various properties and businesses. He died of natural causes in 1939. His wife, Luise Tever was arrested and deported to a Siberian camp in 1941, essentially for being bourgeois, for owning property and being a shareholder of a shipping business. Records show she was released in 1947 but no subsequent information about her has been found. Apparently, Soviet records often showed those who had died in camps as having been released from their sentence.
