= Möller Colliery =

Coal mine in Gladbeck, Germany

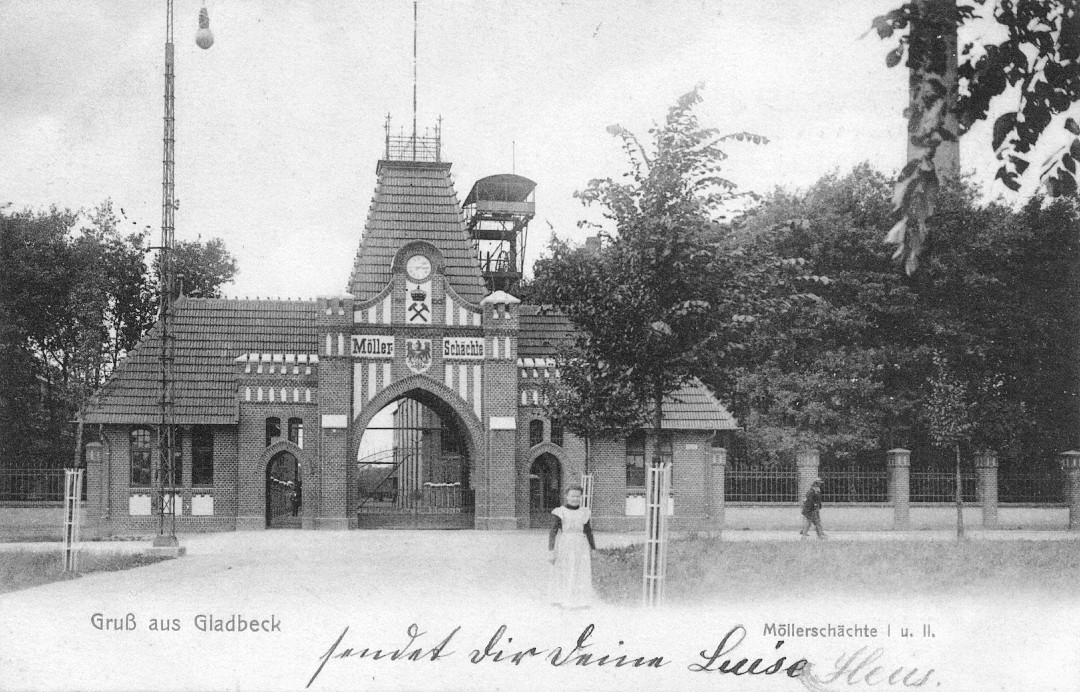
The gatehouse entrance to the Möller Colliery in Gladbeck as depicted on a vintage postcard, circa 1904.

The Möller Colliery was a coal mine in Gladbeck, North Rhine-Westphalia, Germany, which operated from 1901 until 1967, after which time the site was demolished. It was one of the major coal mining operations in the heavily industrialized region in northwestern Germany during the first two-thirds of the 20th century.

== History ==
In 1894, several individual businessmen consolidated their field holdings outside of the city limits of both Bottrop and Gladbeck, forming the United Gladbeck Union (Gewerkschaft Vereinigte Gladbeck), with the intention of creating a new coal mine. Work began in Rentfort in 1895 with the sinking of the Thyssen 1/2 double shaft system. Due to a water ingress, the sinking work had to be temporarily interrupted in 1896, whereupon the sinking of the Professor 3/4 pit began in the southern part of the coalfield. The Thyssen and Professor pits were consolidated under the name Zeche Vereinigte Gladbeck (United Gladbeck Colliery). In 1898 the drilling work was resumed and in 1901 the Thyssen 1/2 mine went into production. In the same year the Prussian state founded the Recklinghausen Mining Company, which controlled the Vereinigte Gladbeck along with a few other mine fields on the northern edge of the industrialized Ruhr region.

The Thyssen 1/2 pit was named the Möllerschächte after the former Prussian trade minister Theodor von Möller. Shaft Möller 1 was equipped with a German strut frame and an auxiliary frame standing at right angles to it for double conveyance, while shaft 2 received only one access system.

Beginning in 1905, Recklinghausen was managed in personal union with Hibernia AG. This led the Möller colliery together with the Rheinbaben Colliery (formerly Professor 3/4) as Mining Inspection 2. In 1911 a coking plant was put into operation at Möller 1/2. In 1915 a ventilation stack was installed between the two shafts. Because of the retention of the common consecutive shaft numbering, this shaft was named Möller 5 and assigned to the Möller plant management.

In 1927, the mining company Recklinghausen was completely taken over by Hibernia AG. Mining Inspection 2 was separated in the Gladbeck mine with the independent plant divisions Möller and Rheinbaben. The coking plants in both shafts were gradually shut down. Starting in 1936, both pits were operated as individual mines. The annual production of the coal mine Möller 1/2 and 5 amounted to 600,000 tons of coal.

In 1940 the Möller Colliery adopted the modern conveying and processing systems of the Rheinbaben Colliery. The Möller 1 shaft structure was converted into a simple strut structure. From 1945 to 1947, the entire conveyance through the Möller 1 shaft had to be pressed into service for both mines, as the main Rheinbaben 3/4 conveying system was shut down due to the war.

== Architecture ==
The Möller Colliery was one of the numerous coal mines in the Ruhr region that was distinguished by its brick industrial architecture. The grounds were entered through a grand three-arched gatehouse that used various Gothic elements such as pointed arches and towers with crenellations, covered with steep hipped roofs. Above the largest central gateway, a sign with the words "Möller Schächte" sandwiched the crest of the German imperial eagle, which in turn was surmounted by crossed pickaxes and a crown, and finally a clock. Other buildings on the grounds also used such distinctive brick architecture, characteristic of the nineteenth-century Gothic Revival structures preferred by the Hanover School in north-central Germany.

== Shutdown ==
Due to the European Coal Crisis of the 1960s, the Möller and Rheinbaben collieries were completely merged into the Möller/Rheinbaben Composite Mine. In 1967 the composite mine was closed because Hibernia AG opted not to expand the site further in favor of the neighboring shafts. The employees were transferred to the Hiberniazechen company.

Shafts Möller 1 and 2 were filled and the above-ground facilities were demolished. The Möller 5 shaft was assigned to the Jacobi/Franz Haniel composite mine as a ventilation shaft.

The site of the Möller Colliery has been completely redeveloped, and its location shows no trace of the mine's presence.

== Bibliography ==
- Wilhelm and Gertrude Hermann, Die alten Zechen an der Ruhr. 6th edition (updated and expanded). Königstein i. Taunus: Verlag Karl Robert Langewiesche, 2006. ISBN 3784569943.
