= TS Laevad =

Company based in Estonia

TS Laevad OÜ
- Industry: Maritime transportation
- Founded: 19 June 2014
- Headquarters: Tallinn, Estonia
- Area served: West Estonian archipelago
- Key people: Indrek Randveer (CEO)
- Net income: €37.59 million (2024)
- Parent: Port of Tallinn
- Website: Official website

TS Laevad ("TS Ships") is an Estonian ferry company which operates two routes between the Estonian mainland and the islands of Hiiumaa and Muhu in the Baltic Sea. Muhu is connected by a causeway to Estonia's largest island, Saaremaa.

The company is a fully owned subsidiary of the Port of Tallinn (Estonian: Tallinna Sadam, "TS"), which is in turn 70 percent owned by the Estonian state. The state subsidises the ferry routes with a sum of over €20 million per annum.

The company operates five ice class ferries, four of which were purpose-built for TS Laevad.

== Routes ==
Two routes across the Väinameri are operated by TS Laevad.

Route	Destination island	Crossing time	Departures (summer)
Rohuküla–Heltermaa	Hiiumaa	1 hr 15 mins	1½ hour interval
Virtsu–Kuivastu	Muhu for Saaremaa	25 mins	35 min interval

== History ==
=== Contract period 2016–2026 ===
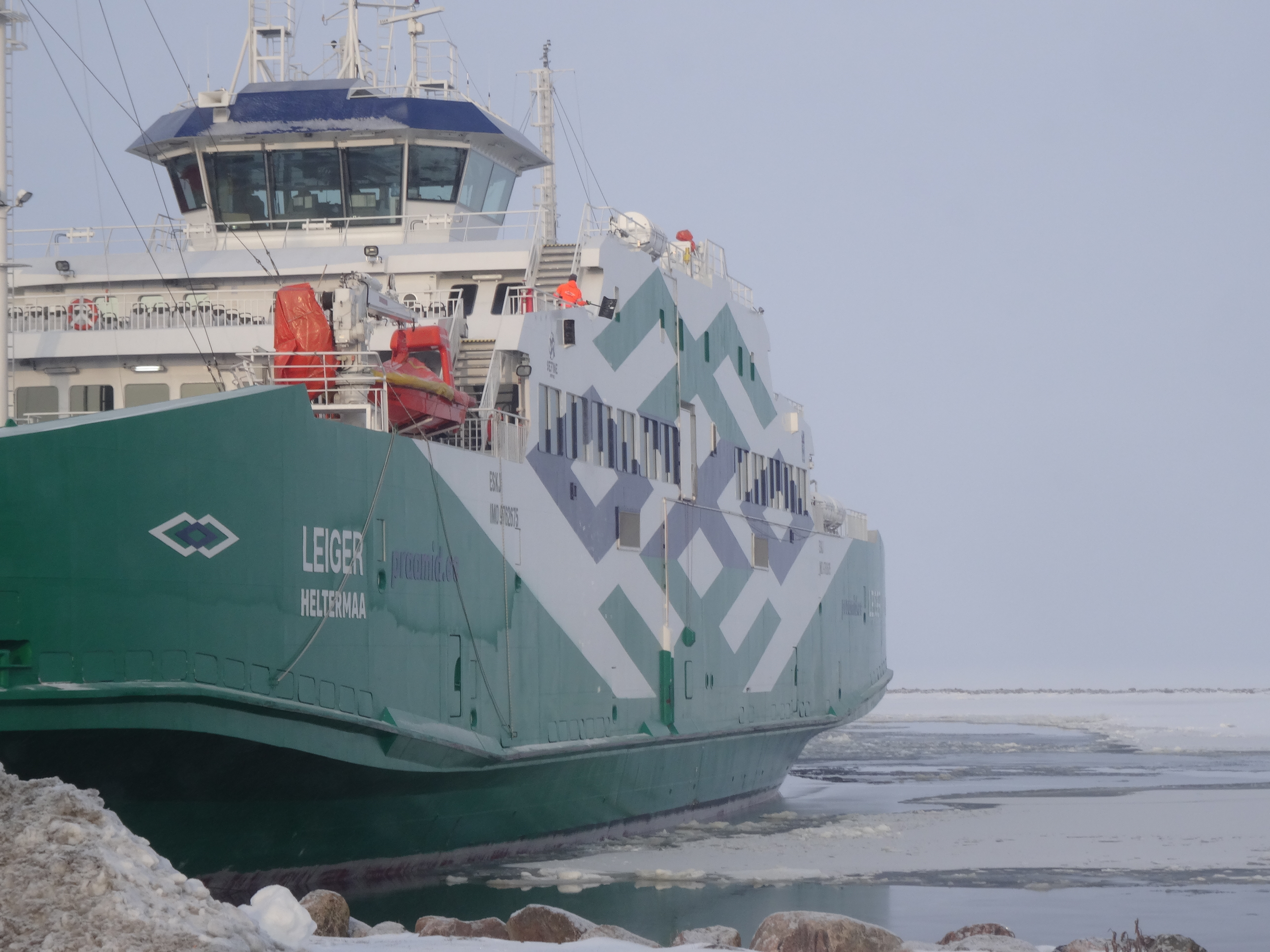
Leiger in Rohuküla, 2018

TS Laevad replaced the previous operator, SLK, on 1 October 2016 after submitting a public procurement bid 64 million euros less than its predecessor. It was originally contracted to operate the routes until 30 September 2026.

As none of TS Laevad's new ferries were delivered in time for the start of the company's contract, three vessels from Vjatšeslav Leedo's Saaremaa Shipping Company (SLK) were chartered as an interim solution. The Sefine Shipyard in Turkey and the Remontowa shipyard in Poland paid TS Laevad a total of nearly €11 million in late fees. All four new ferries were in service by the end of April 2017.

In 2019 the ferry Tõll had batteries installed which were expected to reduce the vessel's diesel consumption by 20%. It thus became the first hybrid passenger vessel in Estonia.

In 2022, the company's ferries carried a total of 2.3 million passengers and 1.1 million vehicles. 72 percent of total passengers sailed on the Saaremaa route, with the remainder on the Hiiumaa route. The busiest month was July, with 394,000 passengers. The least busy month was February, with 96,000 passengers.

In April 2026, Polish shipbuilder CRIST was selected to build a new ferry to replace the ageing Regula. The new ferry will be owned by the Estonian State Fleet and operated by TS Laevad. It will be smaller than the company's own vessels and will have a 1B ice class, lower than the 1A ice class of the existing fleet. The ferry's main power source will be electricity charged from shore and stored in batteries, but there will also be auxiliary diesel generators.

All five ferries had an onboard shop operated by R-Kiosk Estonia AS. In addition, the four larger ferries had a "Take Off" restaurant operated by Baltic Restaurants Estonia.

=== Contract period 2026–2033 ===
In April 2024, TS Laevad won a public tender to operate the Saaremaa and Hiiumaa routes from 1 October 2026 until September 2033. The company was the only bidder in the tender. Under the terms of the new contract the company's profits are capped, after concerns on the islands of seemingly excessive profits.

In connection with the new contract period, Baltic Restaurants Estonia AS won a tender to operate the ships' onboard shops. The shops were renovated in autumn 2026, and continue to offer a different product range to the restaurants despite now being operated by the same company.

=== Incidents and disruptions to service ===
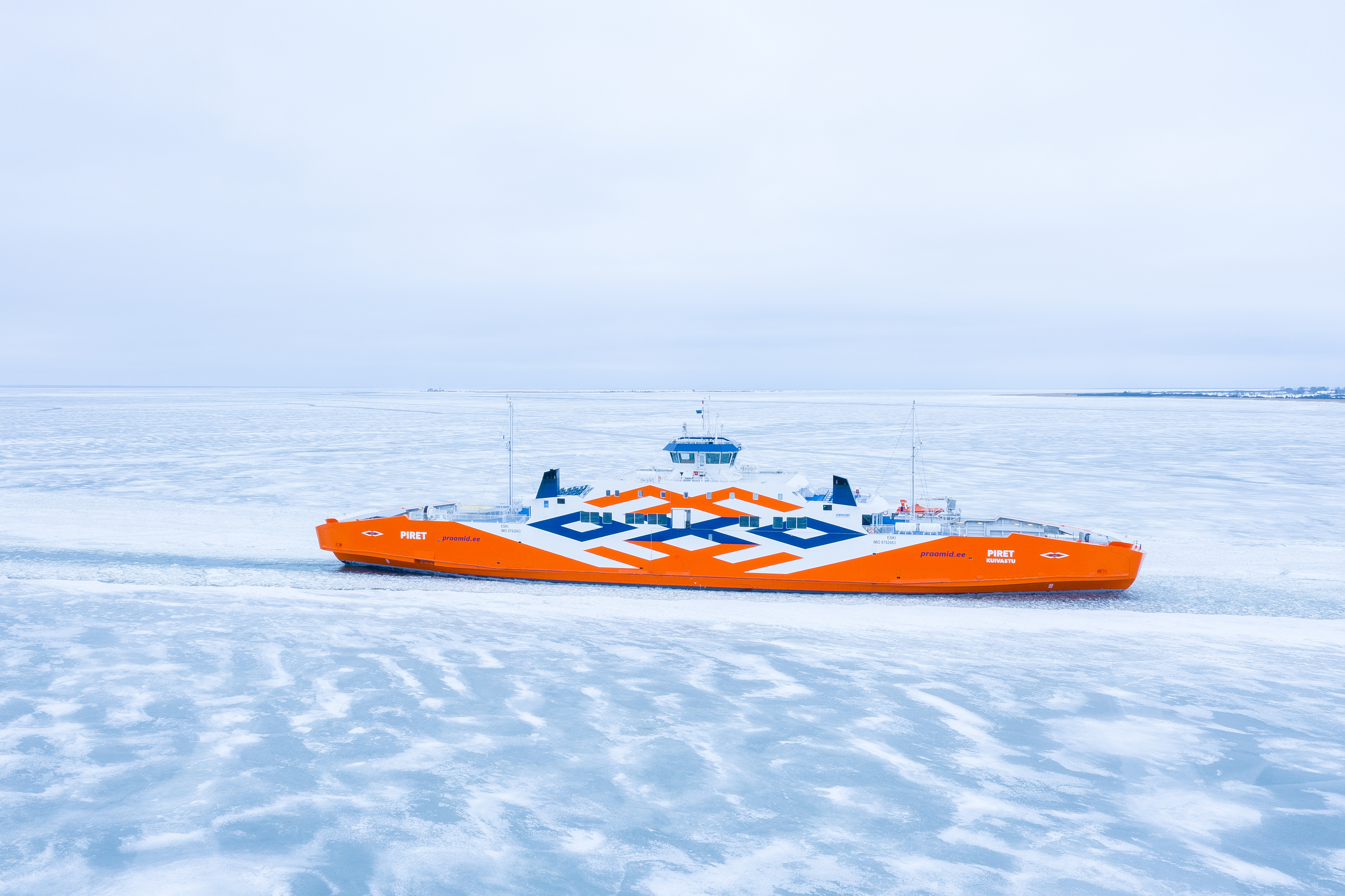
Piret in ice conditions, February 2019. The company's ferries have a 1A ice class, operating in ice with a thickness of up to 80cm.

On 28 July 2017, the ferry Tiiu struck the seabed twice and sustained hull damage en route from Rohuküla to Heltermaa. The incident was caused by a controls failure on autopilot. While Tiiu underwent repairs at Turku Repair Yard in Finland she was replaced by the chartered Hiiumaa for a period of six weeks.

In the spring of 2018 ferry services to Hiiumaa were periodically suspended due to low water levels in the Väinameri. The minister responsible, Kadri Simson, blamed the cancellations on inadequate dredging in the Rukki Channel, through which ferries pass between Rohuküla and Heltermaa.

From mid-March to early May in 2020, TS Laevad reduced the frequency of its services due to the coronavirus pandemic. Travel to the islands was restricted to residents only, and the number of passengers reduced by 92 percent compared to the previous year.

On 22 July 2021 Tõll collided with the berth at Kuivastu Harbour causing damage to the berth, the ferry and some vehicles on board including that of Estonian president Kersti Kaljulaid. Tõll was out of service for over two weeks during the peak summer season causing queues of up to two hours. The company stated that the collision was caused by a technical failure resulting in a loss of engine power as the ferry approached the berth.

In January 2026, TS Laevad reported the worst ice conditions on the Väinameri for ten years, along with low water levels. There were cancellations on the Hiiumaa route, and those services running were subject to delays and vehicle weight restrictions. In February 2026, a 17km ice road was opened between Hiiumaa and Saaremaa to relieve the disrupted ferry route.

== Future developments ==
In 2023, the Ministry of Regional Affairs stated its intention to introduce new environmentally friendly vessels on the routes from 2033.

== Ferries of TS Laevad ==
Ferry	Usual route	In service (Note: With TS Laevad)	Shipyard	Home port	Capacity	Propulsion
MS Leiger	Rohuküla–Heltermaa (Hiiumaa route)	2016–	Sefine shipyard, Turkey	Heltermaa	700 passengers, 150 cars	Diesel
MS Piret	Virtsu–Kuivastu (Saaremaa route)	2017–	Remontowa shipyard, Poland	Kuivastu	700 passengers, 150 cars	Diesel
MS Tiiu	Rohuküla–Heltermaa (Hiiumaa route)	2017–	Sefine shipyard, Turkey	Heltermaa	700 passengers, 150 cars	Diesel
MS Tõll	Virtsu–Kuivastu (Saaremaa route)	2017–	Remontowa shipyard, Poland	Kuivastu	700 passengers, 150 cars	Hybrid; Diesel/electric
MS Regula	Reserve ferry	2016–	Meyer Werft, Germany	Roomassaare	400 passengers, 105 cars	Diesel
New ferry	Virtsu–Kuivastu (Saaremaa route)	2028?	CRIST shipyard, Poland	?	380 passengers, 110 cars	Battery electric with auxiliary diesel

== See also ==
- Kihnu Veeteed – The main operator of domestic ferry services to Estonia's smaller islands
