= Kuivarahu =

Kuivarahu may refer to several geographical objects in Estonia:

- Kuivarahu, small islet in Soonlepa Bay in the Hiiumaa Islets Landscape Reserve
- Kuivarahu, small islet between Liialaid and Tauksi islands
- Kuivarahu, elongated islet in the Väinameri Sea, south of Rukkirahu
- Kuivarahud, small islets south of Vilsandi
- Telve Kuivarahu, small islet near Telve island in the Vilsandi National Park
