= MS Piret =

2017 ferry

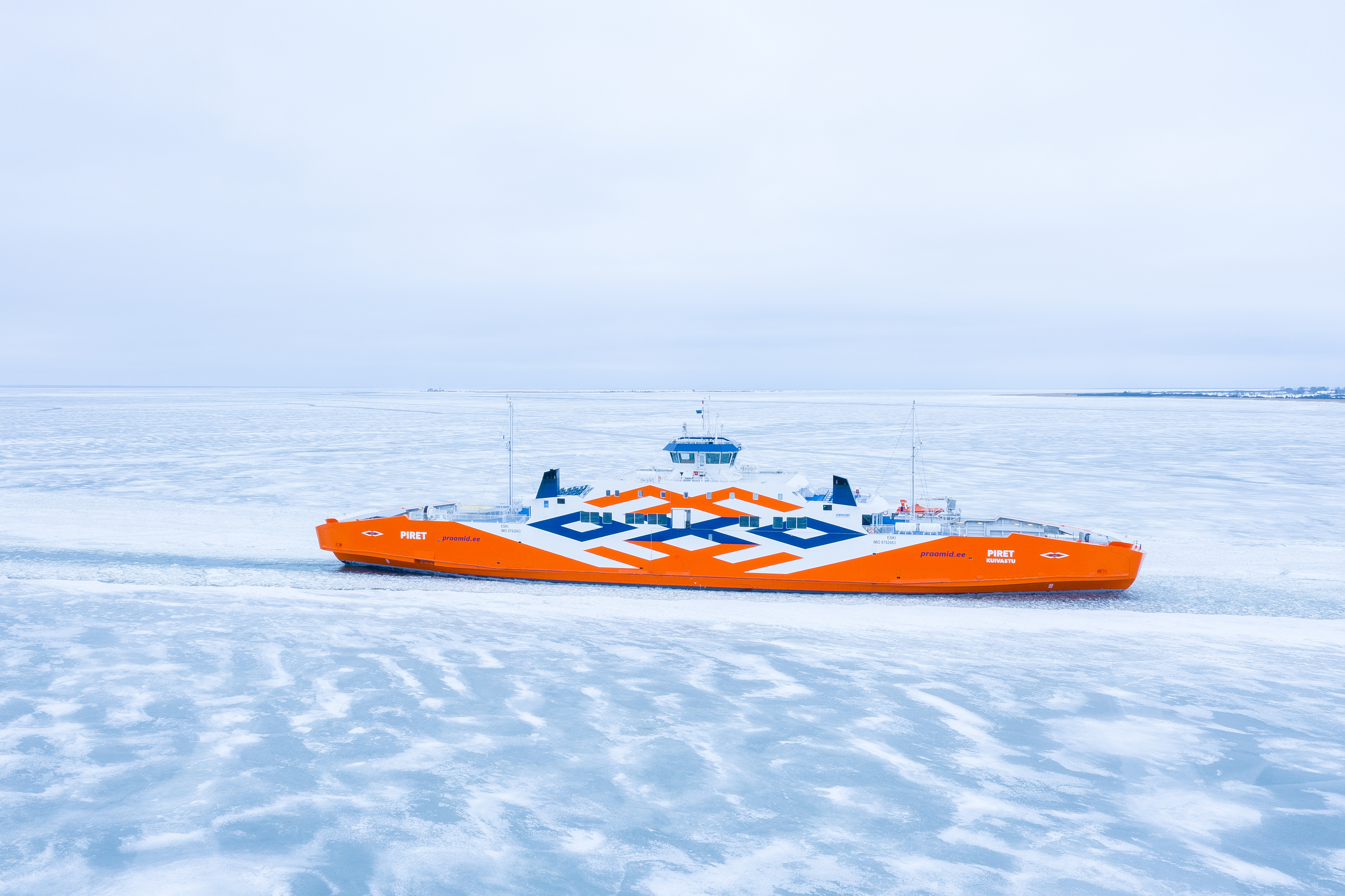
- Piret in Suur Strait

History
- Name: Piret
- Owner: TS Laevad
- Port of registry: Kuivastu, Estonia
- Route: Kuivastu–Virtsu
- Builder: Remontowa Shipyard, Poland
- Cost: 31.5 million euro
- Laid down: 6 May 2015
- Launched: 29 February 2016
- In service: 7 October 2016
- Identification: Call sign: ESKJ; MMSI number: 276823000; IMO number: 9762675
- Status: In service

General characteristics
- Tonnage: 4,987 GT
- Length: 114 m (374 ft 0 in)
- Beam: 19.7 m (65 ft)
- Draught: 4.0 m (13 ft)
- Speed: 15 kn (28 km/h; 17 mph)
- Capacity: 700 passengers

MS Piret is a ferry owned by the Estonia-based ferry operator TS Laevad. The ferry was built by the Remontowa Shipyard in Poland.

Piret was built in 2017 in Gdańsk, Remontowa shipyard. The ship route is Virtsu–Kuivastu.
