= Regula =

Regula may refer to:

- Regula (name)
- Regula (architecture), a feature of the Doric order in classical architecture
- Regula (saint), a Coptic Orthodox and Roman Catholic saint
- Regula (ship, 1993), a passenger ship operating on Lake Zurich in Switzerland
- MS Regula, a car ferry operating in Estonia
- Regula Range, a mountain range of Queen Maud Land, Antarctica
