= MS Tiiu =

2017 ferry

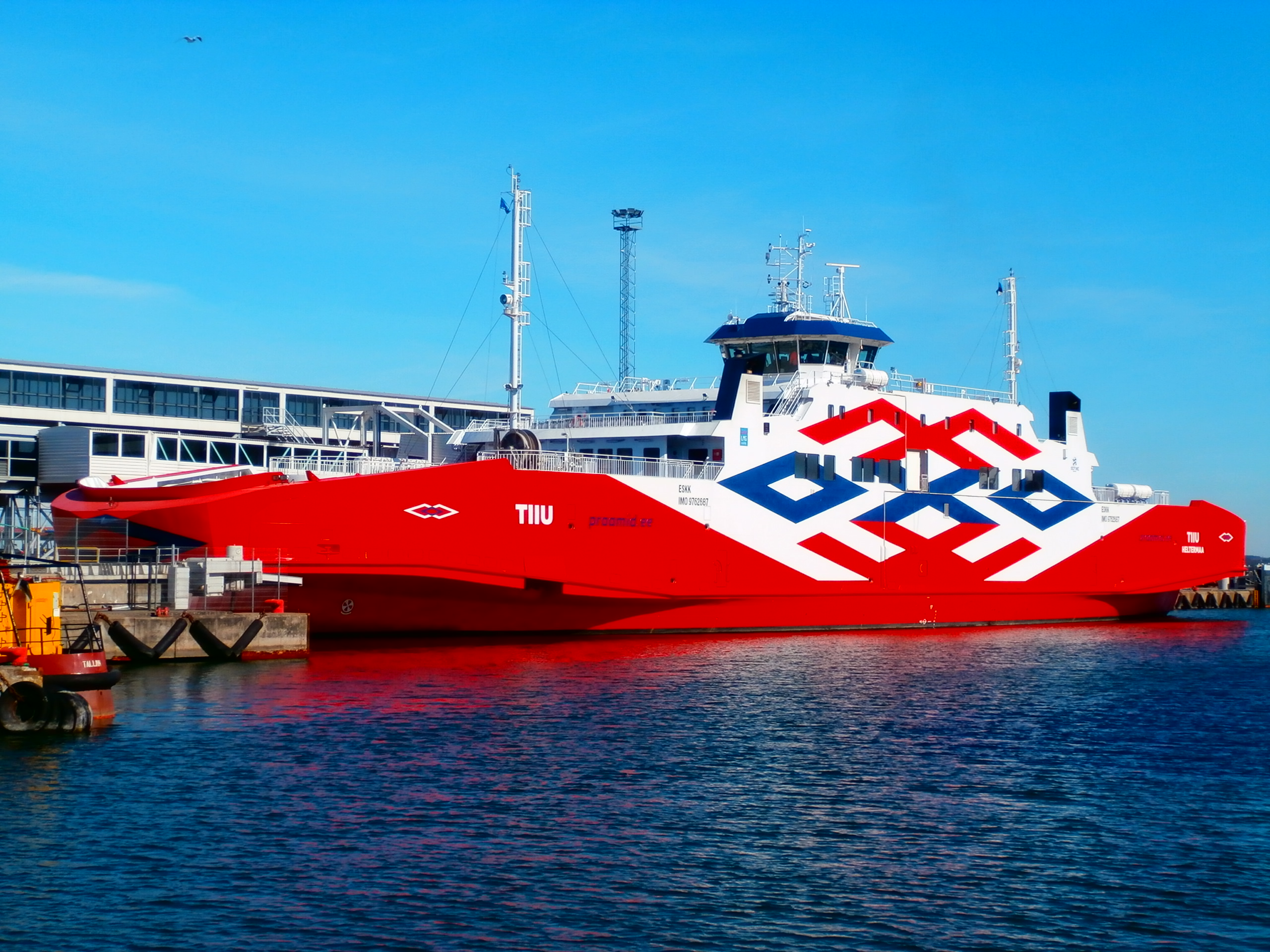
- Tiiu in Tallinn

History
- Name: Tiiu
- Owner: TS Laevad
- Port of registry: Heltermaa, Estonia
- Route: Heltermaa–Rohuküla
- Builder: Sefine Shipyard, Turkey
- Cost: 22.8 million euro
- Launched: 29 April 2016
- Identification: Call sign: ESKK; MMSI number: 276824000; IMO number: 9762687
- Status: In service

General characteristics
- Tonnage: 4,987 GT
- Length: 114 m (374 ft 0 in)
- Beam: 19.7 m (65 ft)
- Draught: 4.0 m (13 ft)
- Speed: 15 kn (28 km/h; 17 mph)
- Capacity: 700 passengers

MS Tiiu is a ferry owned by the Estonia-based ferry operator TS Laevad. The ferry was built by the Sefine Shipyard in Turkey.

== Incidents ==
On 31 July 2017, Tiiu was on her usual route to Rohuküla when suddenly she scratched seabed two times in a row. The incident was caused by the streiking of autopilot which was not possible to switch off. Chief officer who was in the bridge during the collision stated that seeing the ship inclineing to right he tried to correct the course. But the autopilot didn't switch off and when it finally did it was to late and the ship scratched the seabed.
