= MS Leiger =

2016 ferry

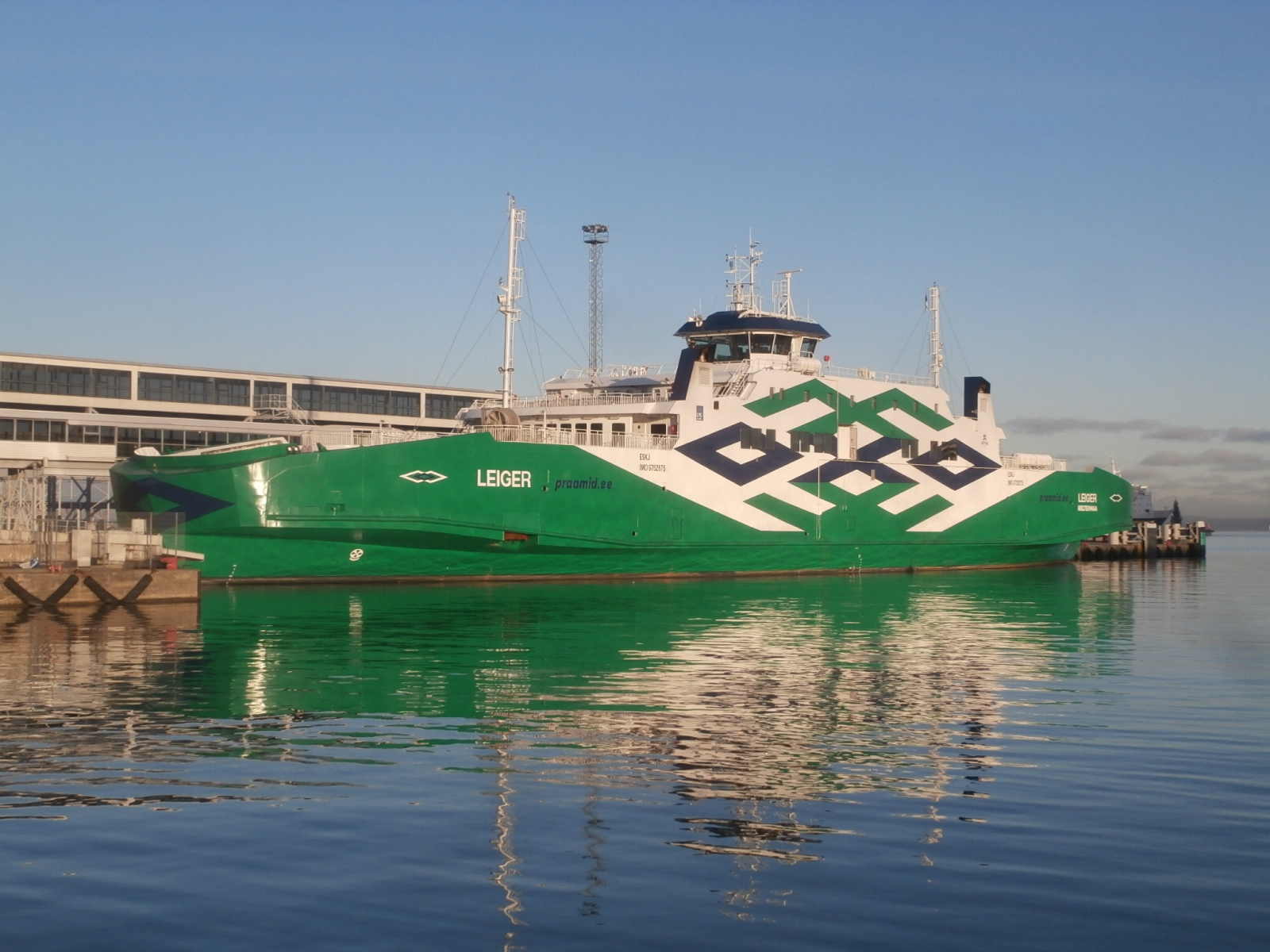
- Leiger in Tallinn

History
- Name: Leiger
- Owner: TS Laevad
- Port of registry: Heltermaa, Estonia
- Route: Heltermaa–Rohuküla
- Builder: Sefine Shipyard, Turkey
- Cost: 22.8 million euro
- Laid down: 6 May 2015
- Launched: 29 February 2016
- In service: 7 October 2016
- Identification: Call sign: ESKJ; MMSI number: 276823000; IMO number: 9762675
- Status: In service

General characteristics
- Tonnage: 4,987 GT
- Length: 114 m (374 ft 0 in)
- Beam: 19.7 m (65 ft)
- Draught: 4.0 m (13 ft)
- Speed: 15 kn (28 km/h; 17 mph)
- Capacity: 700 passengers

MS Leiger is a ferry owned by the Estonia-based ferry operator TS Laevad. The ferry was built by the Sefine Shipyard in Turkey.

The ship is named after Hiiumaa mythical giant Leiger. The ship route is Heltermaa–Rohuküla. Leiger was the first ship of four newly ordered ship of TS Laevad. It was the first newbuild ship for this company.

== Incidents ==
On the night of 2 January 2017, Leiger touched the seabed of Rukkirahu canal two times in a row. Due to the touch of the seabed the ship hull was scratched. The incident was caused by the late turn of the ship due to exhaustion of the captain and briefly falling asleep on the bridge.
