= Mardirahu =

Island in Estonia

Coordinates: 58°49′N 23°27′E

Mardirahu is a former island in Estonia. Mardirahu has merged with the island of Tauksi, an uninhabited island located north of Puise Peninsula in Matsalu National Park.

== See also ==
- List of islands of Estonia
