= MS Tõll =

2017 ferry

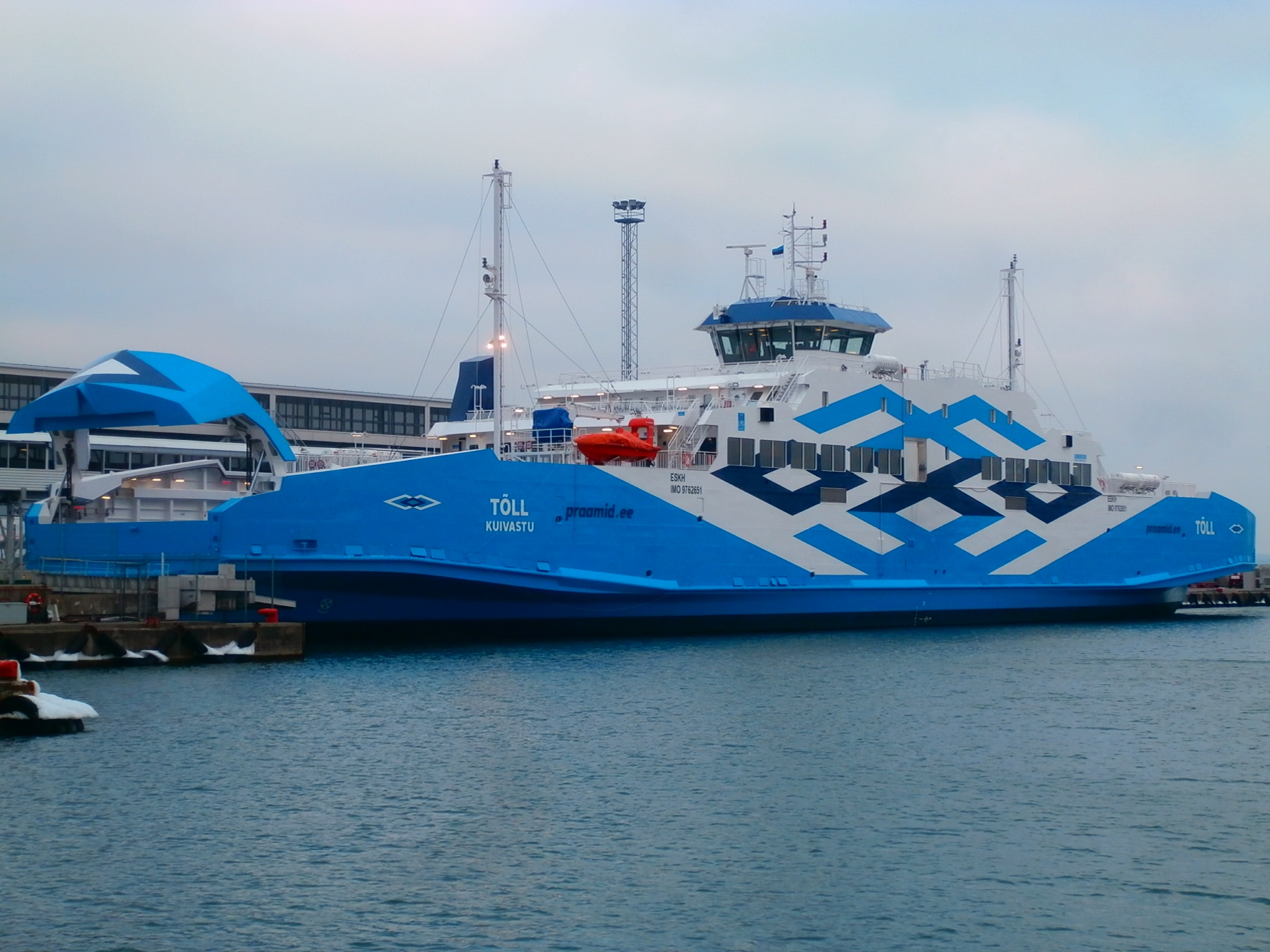
- Tõll in Tallinn 2017

History
- Name: Tõll
- Owner: TS Laevad
- Port of registry: Kuivastu, Estonia
- Route: Kuivastu–Virtsu
- Builder: Remontowa Shipyard, Poland
- Cost: 31.5 million euro
- Launched: 29 December 2015
- Christened: 21 January 2017
- Acquired: 5 January 2017
- In service: 22 January 2017
- Identification: Call sign: ESKH; MMSI number: 276821000; IMO number: 9762651
- Status: In service

General characteristics
- Tonnage: 4,987 GT
- Length: 114 m (374 ft 0 in)
- Beam: 19.7 m (65 ft)
- Draught: 4.0 m (13 ft)
- Ice class: 1A
- Speed: 15 kn (28 km/h; 17 mph)
- Capacity: 700 passengers

MS Tõll is a ferry owned by the Estonian ferry operator TS Laevad. The ferry was built by the Remontowa Shipyard in Poland. Tõll was built in 2017 in Gdańsk, Remontowa shipyard. The ship route is Virtsu–Kuivastu.

In 2020, Tõll was installed with battery banks to reduce consuming of diesel fuel. This change reduces the consumption of diesel fuel and exhaust gases. This whole project cost 1.6 million euros and Tõll is first and only hybrid ship of TS Laevad that uses both diesel and electricity.

== Incidents ==
In July 21, 2021, Tõll was on her route to Kuivastu when she suddenly hit the harbor wharf. The ship damaged the harbor ramp which deformed after the ship hit it. The incident was caused by the technical malfunction. Estonian president Kersti Kaljulaid was on board the ship during collision.
