= Rukkirahu =

Island in Estonia

Coordinates: 58°54′14″N 23°21′27″E

Rukkirahu (English translation: Rye shoal) is a small, uninhabited island in the Baltic Sea belonging to the country of Estonia.

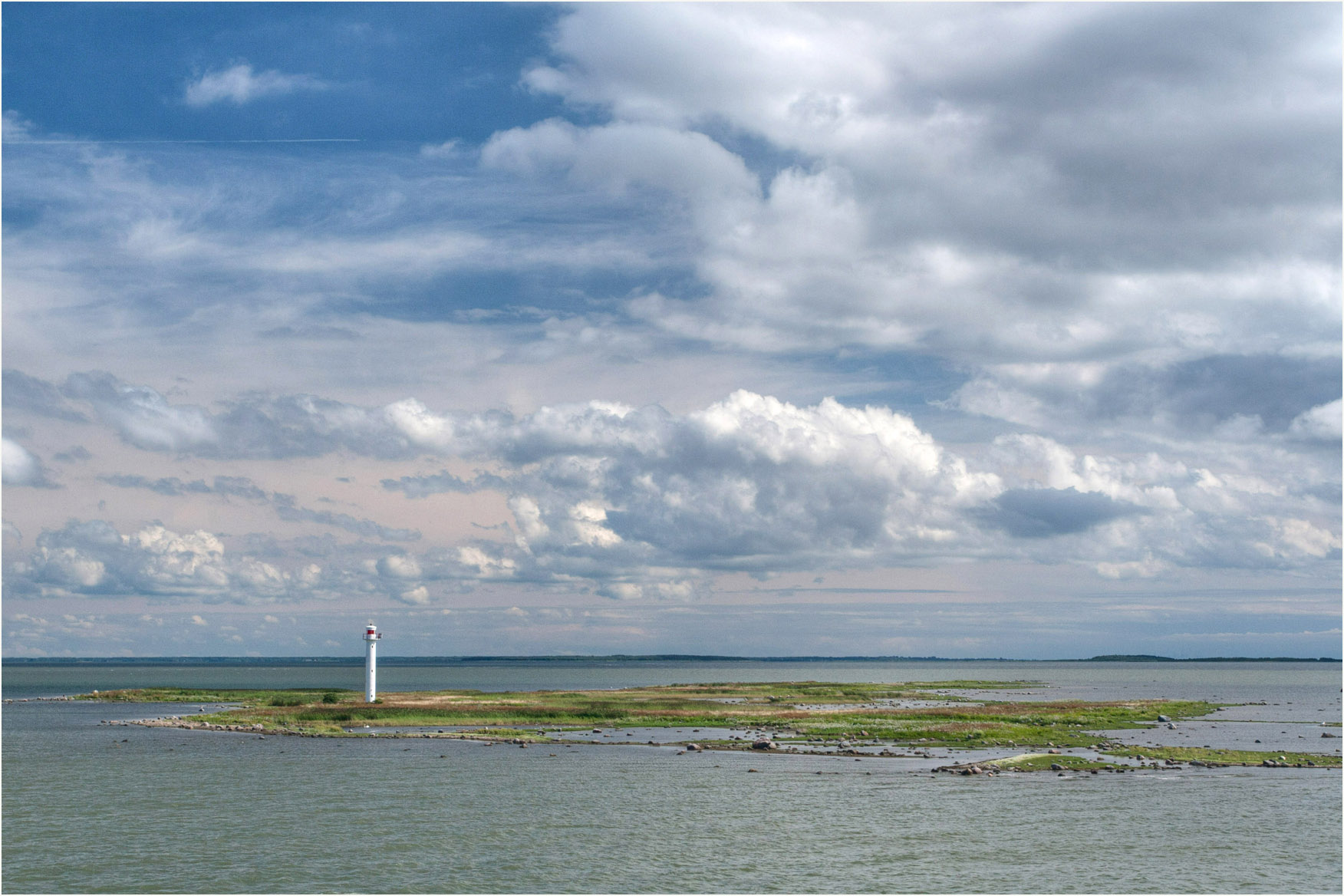
Rukkirahu island and its lighthouse seen from the south.

Rukkirahu lies off the western coast of Estonia, between the mainland in the Väinameri Strait and is located west of the mainland village of Rohuküla, near the city of Haapsalu. The island belongs administratively to the municipality of Ridala Parish in Lääne County.

The island's name origins are traced to a time when grain was transported across the winter road on the frozen sea from Hiiumaa to the mainland. As rye was one of grains transported during winter months, some would inevitably trickle out on the stopover on Rukkirahu and then germinate on the island in spring.

Since 1860, a prominent, operational lighthouse has been in use on the island, especially important for sea links between Heltermaa on the island of Hiiumaa and Rohuküla on the Estonian mainland. The current lighthouse dates from 1940 and the light is visible at night for 5 to 6 nautical miles (6 to 7 miles; 9 to 11 kilometres).

== See also ==
- List of islands of Estonia
