= Aruküla, Hiiu County =

Village in Estonia

Aruküla
- Village
- Location within Estonia
- Coordinates: 58°51′33″N 23°00′04″E
- Country: Estonia
- County: Hiiu County
- Parish: Hiiumaa Parish
- Time zone: UTC+2 (EET)
  - Summer (DST): UTC+3 (EEST)

Aruküla is a village in Hiiumaa Parish, Hiiu County in northwestern Estonia.

The village was first mentioned in 1688 (Arråküllaby). Historically the village was part of Suuremõisa Manor, and in 1795 part of Soonlepa Manor.

From 1977 to 1997, Aruküla was part of the village of Heltermaa.
