= MS Regula =

1971 ship

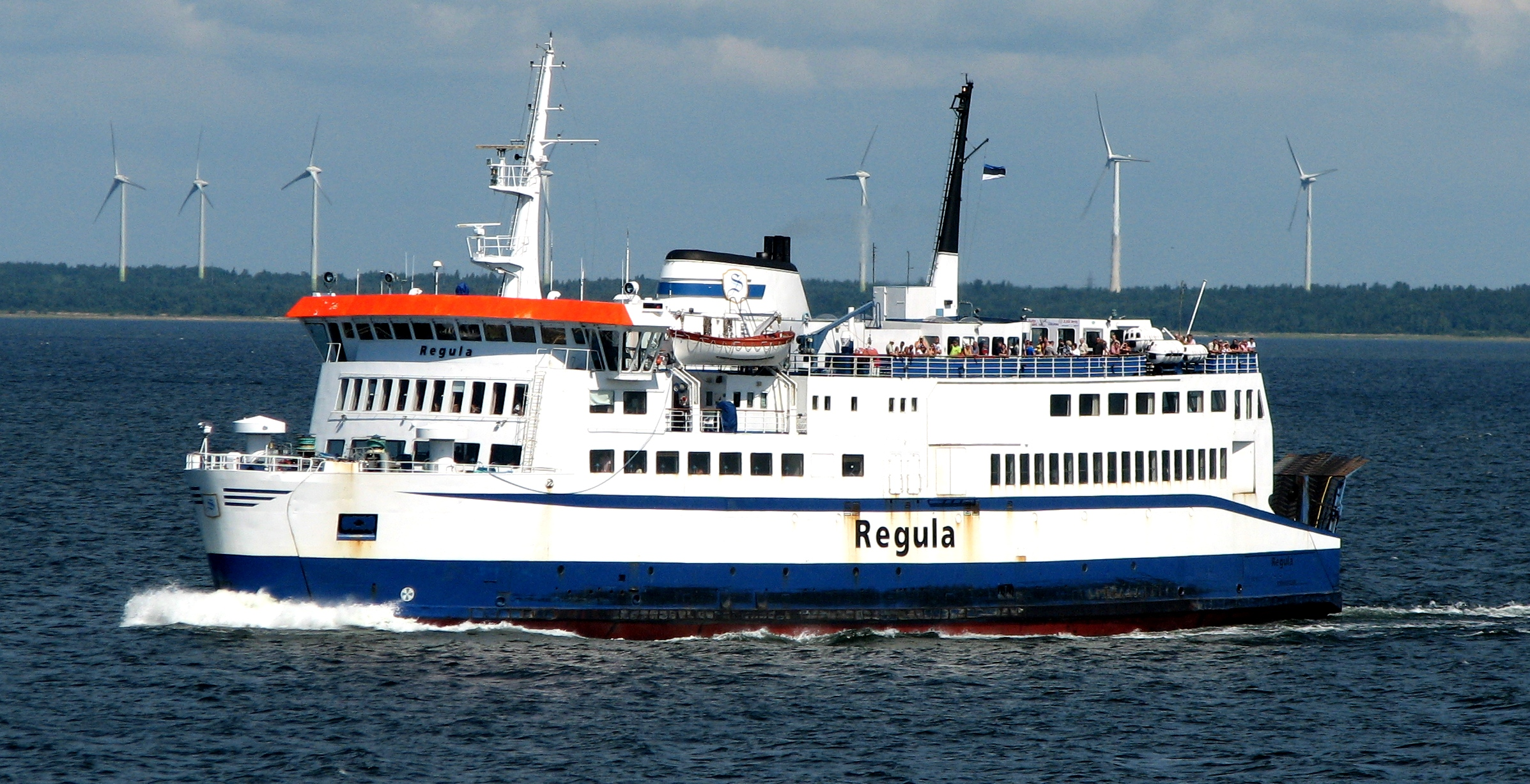
- Regula in Estonia, 2010

History
- Name: Regula
- Owner: TS Laevad
- Port of registry: Roomassaare, Estonia
- Route: Reserve ferry
- Builder: Meyer Werft, Germany
- Launched: 18 February 1971
- Status: In service

General characteristics
- Length: 71.2 m (233 ft 7 in)
- Beam: 16.3 m (53 ft 6 in)
- Draught: 4.2 m (13 ft 9 in)
- Speed: 12 kn (22 km/h; 14 mph)
- Capacity: 400 passengers; 105 cars

MS Regula is a passenger and vehicle ferry built in Germany by Meyer Werft and launched in 1971. She was initially operated by LB ferries on the Helsingør–Helsingborg ferry route between Denmark and Sweden. Regula was the second of three identical sister vessels, and had an initial capacity of 800 passengers and 75 cars.

After 26 years of service in Scandinavia, in 1997 Regula was sold to Saaremaa Shipping Company of Estonia to serve its routes between the Estonian mainland and the islands of Saaremaa and Hiiumaa in the Baltic Sea.

Both Regula and operations on the island routes were taken over by TS Laevad in 2016. Since the introduction of new, larger ferries on the routes in 2017, Regula has been used primarily as a reserve ferry.
