= Regula (name) =

Regula is both a surname and a given name. Notable people with the name include:

== People with the surname ==
- Alec Regula (born 2000), American ice hockey player
- Lauren Bay Regula (born 1981), Canadian softball player
- Marcel Reguła (born 2006), Polish footballer
- Paulo Regula (born 1989), Portuguese footballer
- Ralph Regula (1924–2017), American politician
- Robert Regula, American politician

== People with the given name ==
- Regula Mühlemann (born 1986), Swiss opera singer
- Regula Rytz (born 1962), Swiss sociologist, historian and politician
- Regula Tschumi, Swiss social anthropologist and art historian

== See also ==
- Felix and Regula, saints
