= Vyacheslav Leedo =

Estonian entrepreneur

Vyacheslav Leedo (Estonian: Vjatšeslav Leedo; born 1952) is an Estonian entrepreneur.

He was born in Kuressaare.

In 1991, he bought three cargo ships. Since 1995, he is the key figure of ship transportation related to Saaremaa and Hiiumaa. He is the owner of Saaremaa Shipping Company.

In 2000s, Leedo had a long-lasting court trial against the Delfi news portal, because the portal was responsible of publishing defamatory comments about Leedo activities.

In 2005, his assets were estimated at 110 million kroons (7 million euros), in 2006 at 180.26 million kroons and in 2007 at 461 million kroons (29.5 million euros).

In 2015, Leedo ultimately won the court trial.

In October 2025, Leedo was sentenced to a prison term, after previously being found guilty of driving Saaremaa Shipping Company into insolvency. In 2026 Estonia's Supreme Court upheld convictions against Leedo and two other (Tõnis Rihvk, a management board member of Saaremaa Shipping Company (SLK), and supervisory board member Lennart Viikmaa, who were also charged with forgery related to the case) former Saaremaa Shipping Company executives for causing the firm's insolvency.
