= Saaremaa Shipping Company =

Estonian ferry company

- Industry: Maritime transportation
- Founded: 1992
- Headquarters: Kuressaare, Estonia
- Area served: West Estonian archipelago
- Key people: Vjatšeslav Leedo
- Services: Passenger transport, freight
- Website: www.laevakompanii.ee

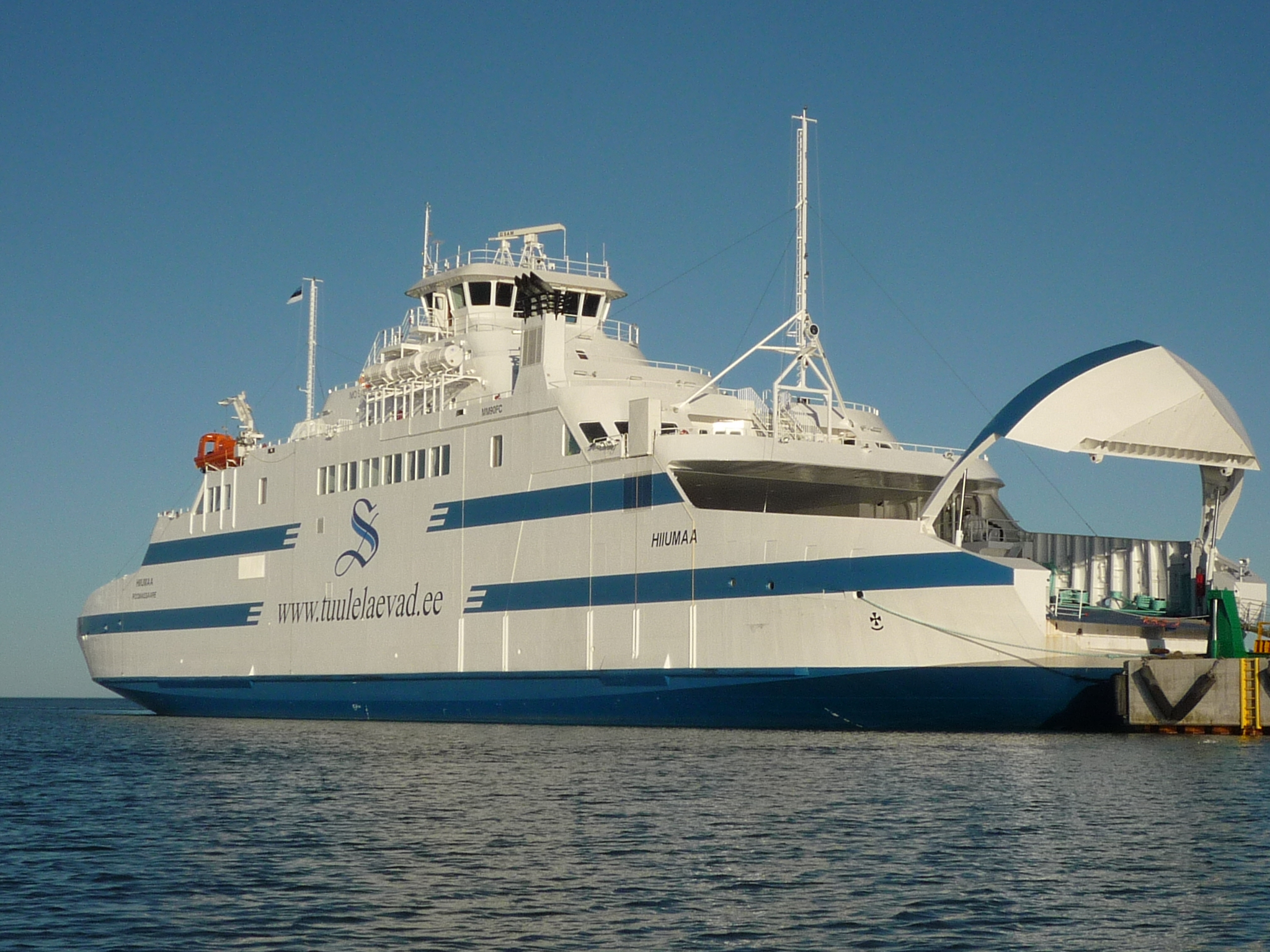
"Hiiumaa" in Heltermaa harbour, 2011

Saaremaa Shipping Company (Estonian: Saaremaa Laevakompanii, SLK) was a company which served the main sea routes between the Estonian mainland and its two major islands, Saaremaa and Hiiumaa. Since 1 October 2016 these routes have been operated by TS Laevad. SLK was declared bankrupt in November 2018.

SLK's three sister ships "Saaremaa", "Hiiumaa" and "Muhumaa" were sold to Elb-Link in Germany. They were sold again in 2018 to service routes in eastern Canada.

== Termination of bankruptcy proceedings ==
In May 2026, the Pärnu County Court approved the final report and terminated the bankruptcy proceedings of Saaremaa Shipping Company (AS Saaremaa Laevakompanii) in case no. 2-18-14646/239, formally concluding the bankruptcy process in Estonia. Following the decision, the company was reported in Estonian media as having exited bankruptcy proceedings.

== See also ==
- Vjatšeslav Leedo, owner of SLK
- TS Laevad, company which replaced SLK in 2016
- Kihnu Veeteed, operator of six domestic ferry routes
- Ferry class MM 90 FC (in German)
