= Liia (island) =

Island in Estonia

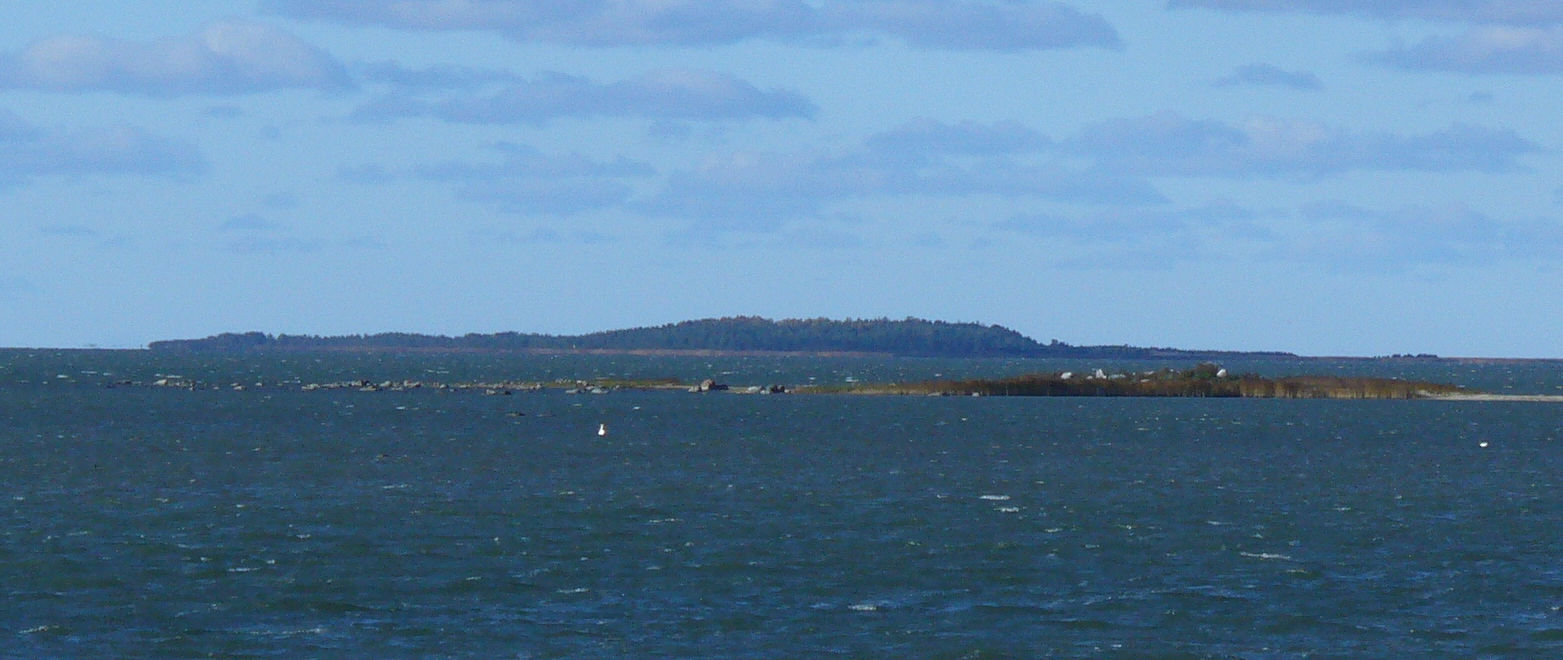
- View of Liia Island (in the background)

- The Location of Liia in Estonia

Geography
- Coordinates: 58°50′13″N 23°23′49″E

Administration
- Estonia
- County: Lääne County
- Municipality: Haapsalu

Liia (or Liialaid) is an island belonging to the country of Estonia. The island is mostly beach ridges and consists of meadows, juniper and pine forest at its highest points.

== See also ==
List of islands of Estonia
