= Tauksi =

Island in Estonia

Coordinates: 58°49′N 23°27′E

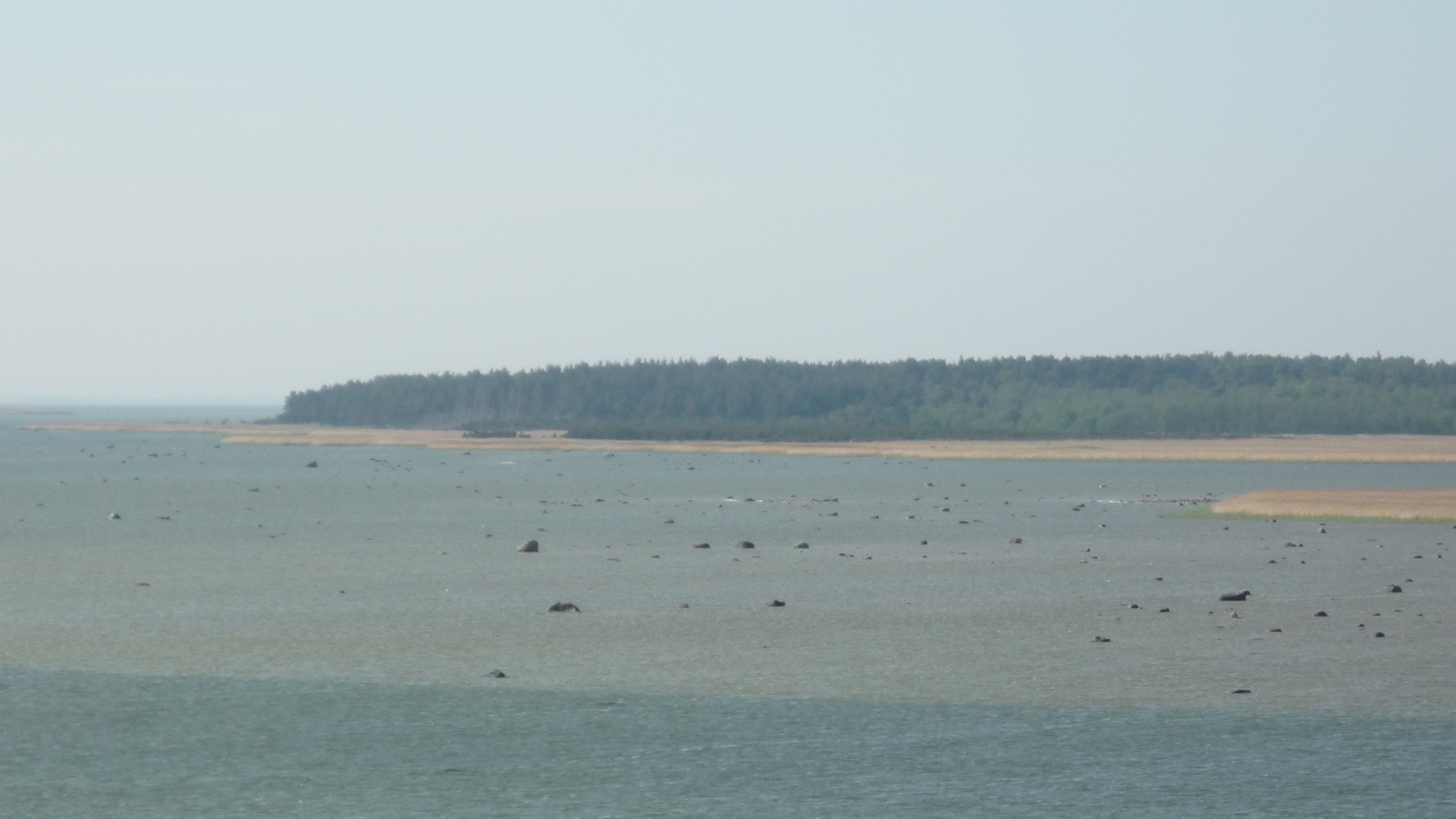
Tauksi south coast in 2009

Tauksi is an uninhabited Estonian island, located north of Puise Peninsula in Matsalu National Park. Its area is about 2,5 km^{2} and it is the 19th largest island in Estonia.

== See also ==
- List of islands of Estonia
