= Racundra's First Cruise =

1923 book by Arthur Ransome

- 1956 Penguin Books edition
- Author: Arthur Ransome
- Subject: Travel
- Set in: Baltic Sea
- Publisher: G. Allen & Unwin
- Publication date: 1923
- Media type: Print
- OCLC: 2424310
- Dewey Decimal: 914.74
- LC Class: D965

Racundra's First Cruise is the first book about sailing written by Arthur Ransome, author of the Swallows and Amazons series. It describes a trip he made across the Baltic Sea from Riga in Latvia to Helsinki in Finland and back in a 9 metre sailing boat that he had built.

== Background ==
During the First World War, Ransome had spent much of his time as a news correspondent in Russia, where he covered the revolution and its aftermath. He was living in Moscow when he approached the designer Otto Eggers in Reval (Tallinn) in Estonia to build him a sturdy cruising boat. He planned to sail Racundra back to England, but delays in finishing her meant that there was only time for a proving trip in 1922 before the winter and the return to England had to be put off. The six-week trip took till nearly the end of September and much of the account was written on board. He was to marry Evgenia Petrovna Shelepina, the ex-private secretary of Leon Trotsky two years later when his divorce papers came through, before Racundra's third cruise.

"Racundra turned out to be all that I had hoped. We took her to sea in the Baltic autumn; we had her at sea when big steamers reported damage from the heavy weather, and never once did she show the smallest sign of disquiet. Weather that was good enough for us was good enough for her, and when the Equinox flung her home with a last flick of his mighty tail, she sailed through the rollers on the bar and the troubled Dvina, serene, neat, as if she was returning from a day's trip in June."

== The voyage ==
Ransome set out with two crew members whom he doesn't name directly. One is simply called "The Cook", in actuality she is his lover and later wife Evgenia Petrovna Shelepina, but he says that she takes "most of the credit for the ease and pleasantness of the voyage. She can take her trick at the tiller if need be, but that, for her, is holiday. All the hard work was hers."

The other is called the "Ancient Mariner", an old sailor who Ransome had met in Riga living in a small hut on a raft and who had sailed in the tea clippers including Thermopylae, and been harbourmaster of the "Lilliput port". When he begged Ransome to take him, "I, of course, agreed with joy, as there is no such rigger in the Baltic as the Ancient Mariner". His real name was Captain Carl Sehmel and his character is also featured in several of the Swallows and Amazons books as Peter Duck and Simon, a wherry sailor in Coot Club.

== Sequel ==
A sequel, Racundra's Third Cruise (Racundra Goes Inland), was compiled by Brian Hammett from Ransome's unpublished typescript and published in 2002. It details a cruise inland on the same boat, up the river Lielupe (then known as the Aa) from Riga to Jelgava, taken in late summer 1924, as a honeymoon cruise after his marriage to Evgenia Shelepina.
