= Virtsu =

Borough in Estonia

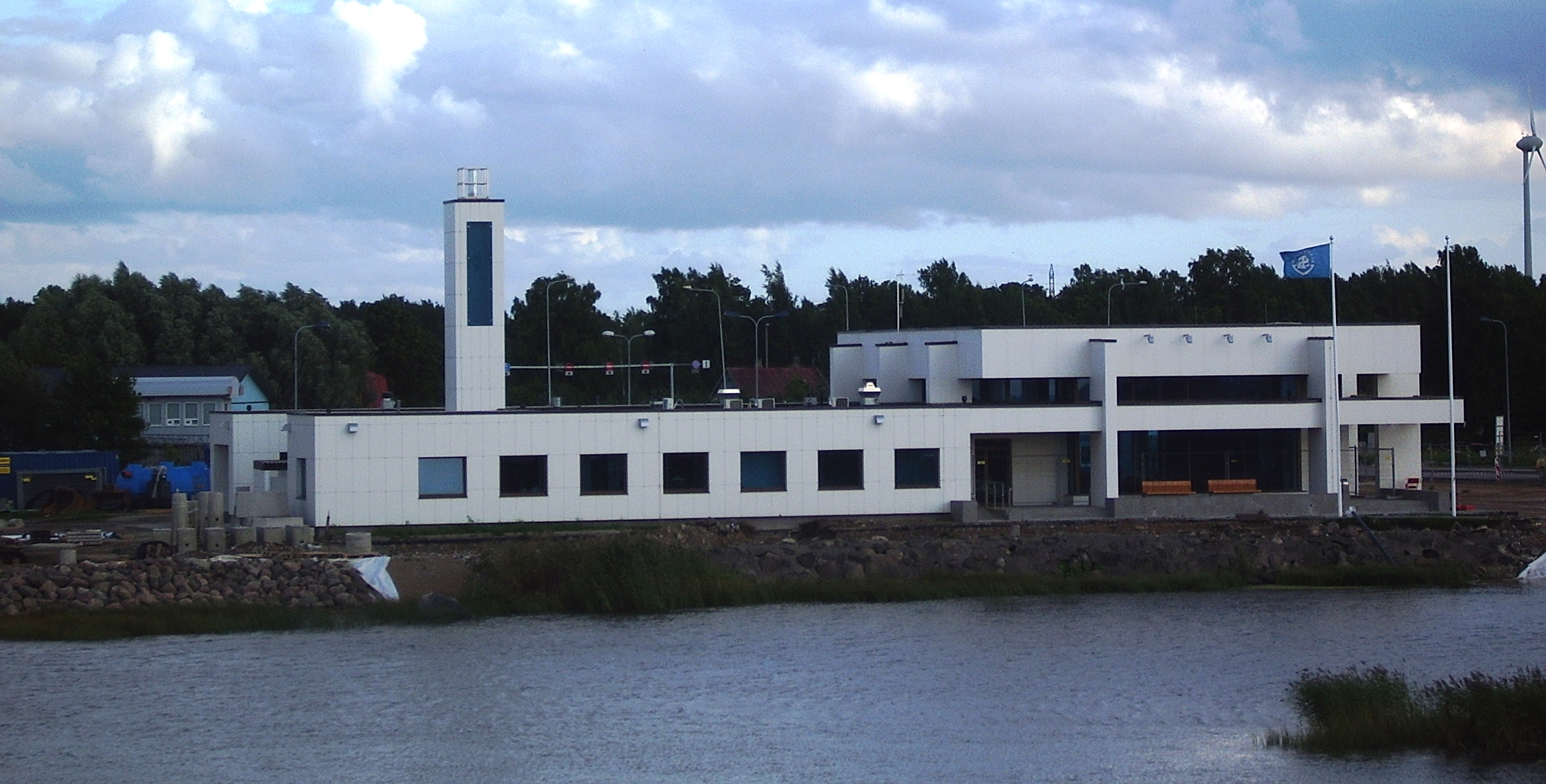
- Port of Virtsu

- Location within Estonia
- Coordinates: 58°34′12″N 23°31′26″E
- Country: Estonia
- County: Pärnu County
- Parish: Lääneranna Parish

Population (2011 Census)
  - Total: 539
- Time zone: UTC+2 (EET)

Virtsu (German: Werder) is a small borough (alevik) in Lääneranna Parish, Pärnu County, Estonia. It lies on the western coast of continental Estonia, and is a location of the main port for traffic to and from Saaremaa, the largest island of Estonia. The Virtsu ferry goes to Kuivastu, which is located on the island of Muhu, which is in turn connected to Saaremaa by the largest causeway in Estonia, the Väinatamm.

As of the 2011 Census, the settlement's population was 539.

Puhtu peninsula, a former island, belongs to Virtsu.

== In popular culture ==
Virtsu (referred to by earlier names Werder and Wirtsu) is described by English adventurer-writer Arthur Ransome in his nautical yarn Racundra's First Cruise.

== Climate ==
Climate data for Virtsu (normals 1991–2020, extremes 1903–present)
Month	Jan	Feb	Mar	Apr	May	Jun	Jul	Aug	Sep	Oct	Nov	Dec	Year
Record high °C (°F)	9.0 (48.2)	9.5 (49.1)	19.6 (67.3)	22.0 (71.6)	30.7 (87.3)	32.8 (91.0)	32.5 (90.5)	33.0 (91.4)	27.8 (82.0)	20.6 (69.1)	13.0 (55.4)	11.4 (52.5)	33.0 (91.4)
Mean daily maximum °C (°F)	−0.1 (31.8)	−0.7 (30.7)	2.5 (36.5)	8.6 (47.5)	14.9 (58.8)	18.9 (66.0)	22.0 (71.6)	21.3 (70.3)	16.4 (61.5)	10.2 (50.4)	5.1 (41.2)	2.0 (35.6)	10.1 (50.2)
Daily mean °C (°F)	−2.3 (27.9)	−3.3 (26.1)	−0.7 (30.7)	4.6 (40.3)	10.7 (51.3)	15.1 (59.2)	18.2 (64.8)	17.5 (63.5)	13.1 (55.6)	7.6 (45.7)	3.2 (37.8)	0.1 (32.2)	7.0 (44.6)
Mean daily minimum °C (°F)	−4.7 (23.5)	−5.9 (21.4)	−3.6 (25.5)	1.5 (34.7)	6.9 (44.4)	11.5 (52.7)	14.7 (58.5)	14.0 (57.2)	10.0 (50.0)	5.1 (41.2)	1.2 (34.2)	−2 (28)	4.1 (39.4)
Record low °C (°F)	−33.7 (−28.7)	−29.8 (−21.6)	−26.7 (−16.1)	−15.8 (3.6)	−3.8 (25.2)	1.1 (34.0)	5.9 (42.6)	4.0 (39.2)	−2.9 (26.8)	−8 (18)	−16.6 (2.1)	−33.6 (−28.5)	−33.7 (−28.7)
Average precipitation mm (inches)	52 (2.0)	42 (1.7)	36 (1.4)	32 (1.3)	32 (1.3)	55 (2.2)	58 (2.3)	75 (3.0)	57 (2.2)	70 (2.8)	63 (2.5)	54 (2.1)	624 (24.6)
Average precipitation days (≥ 1.0 mm)	11.3	9.0	8.3	7.5	6.2	8.5	8.2	9.2	9.3	11.8	12.0	12.1	113.4
Average relative humidity (%)	89	88	84	78	74	77	78	79	82	85	88	89	83
Source: Estonian Weather Service (precipitation days 1971–2000)

== Gallery ==
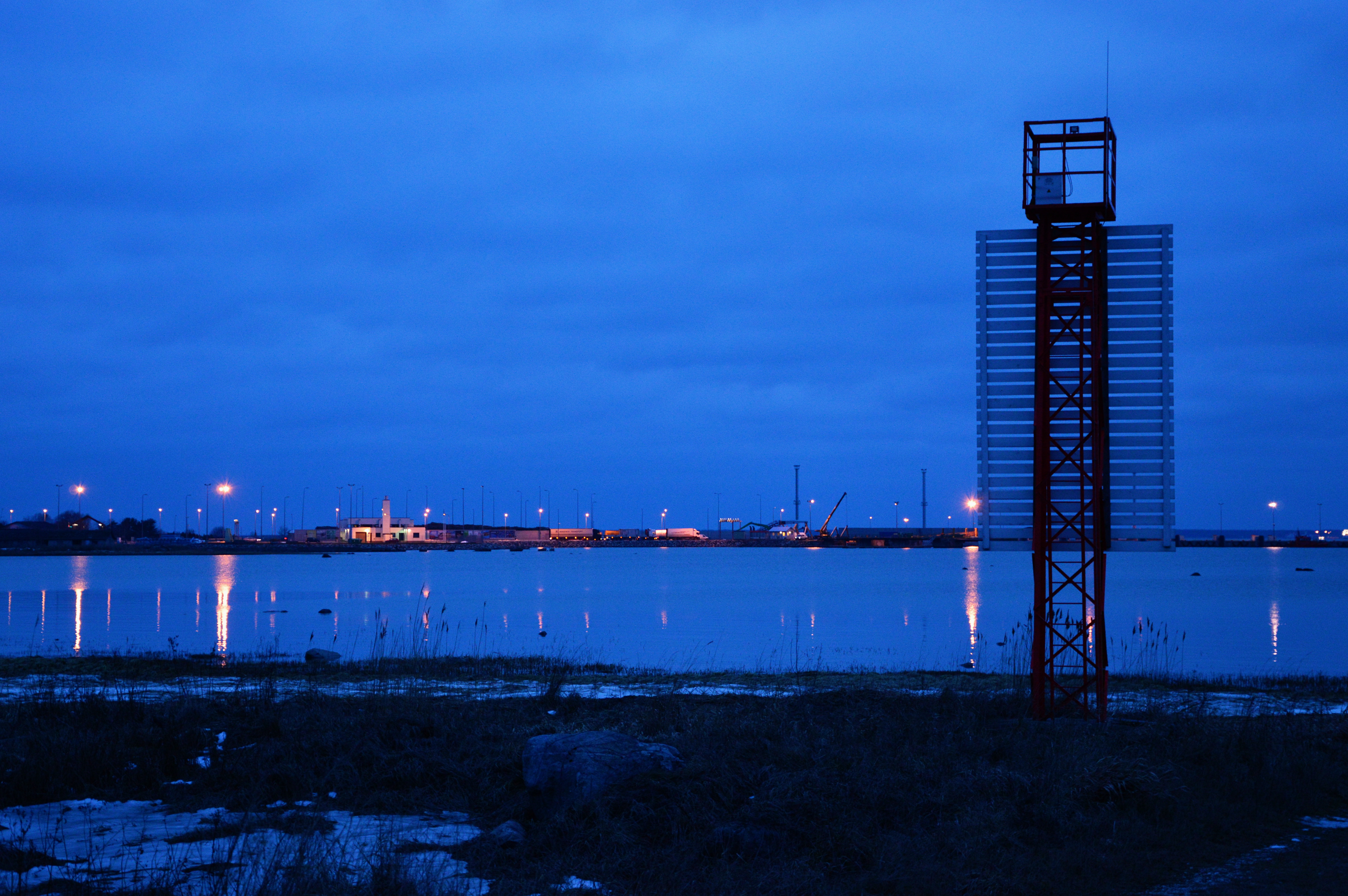
Port of Virtsu

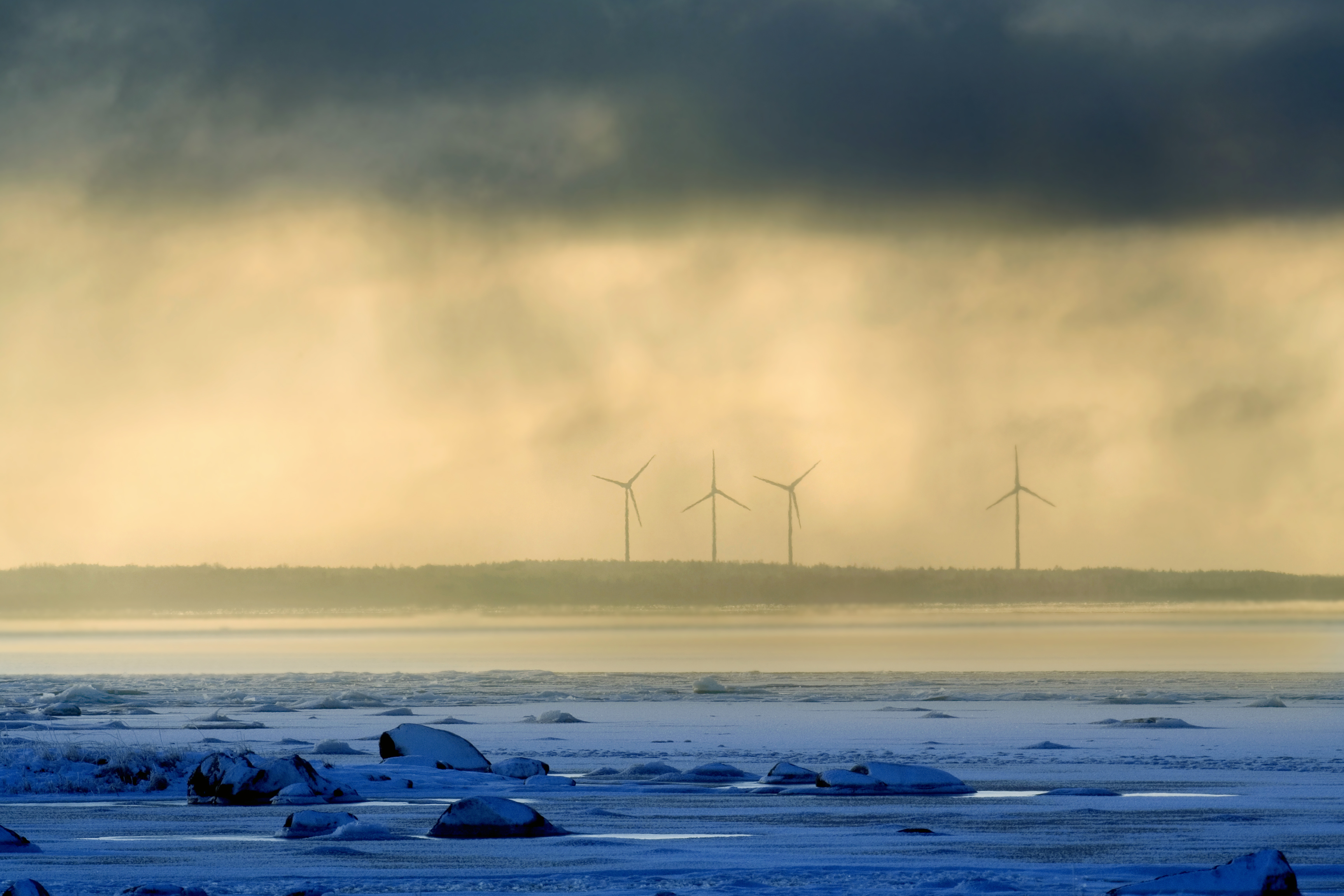
Wind farm in Virtsu

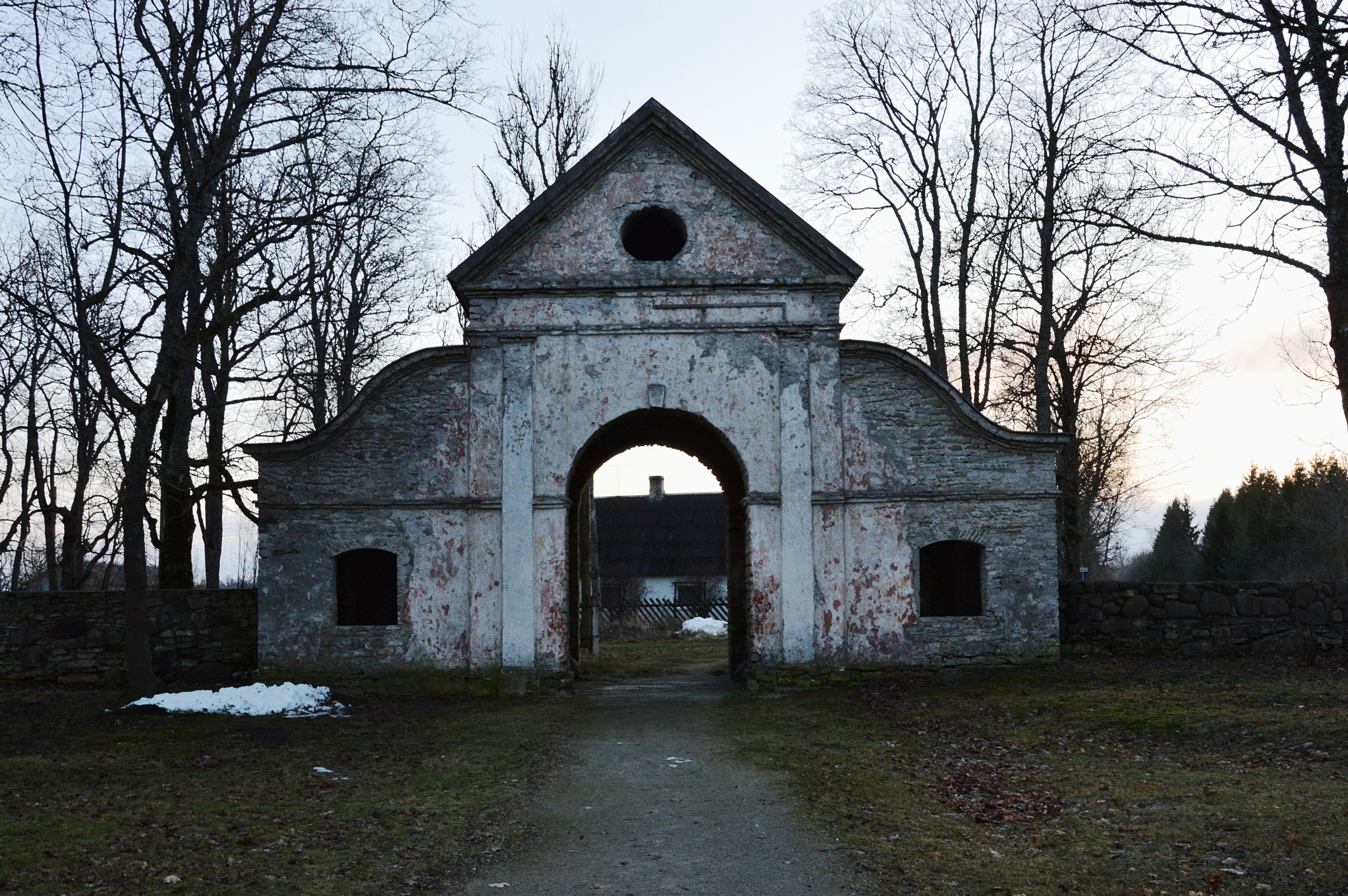
Gate to Virtsu manor park

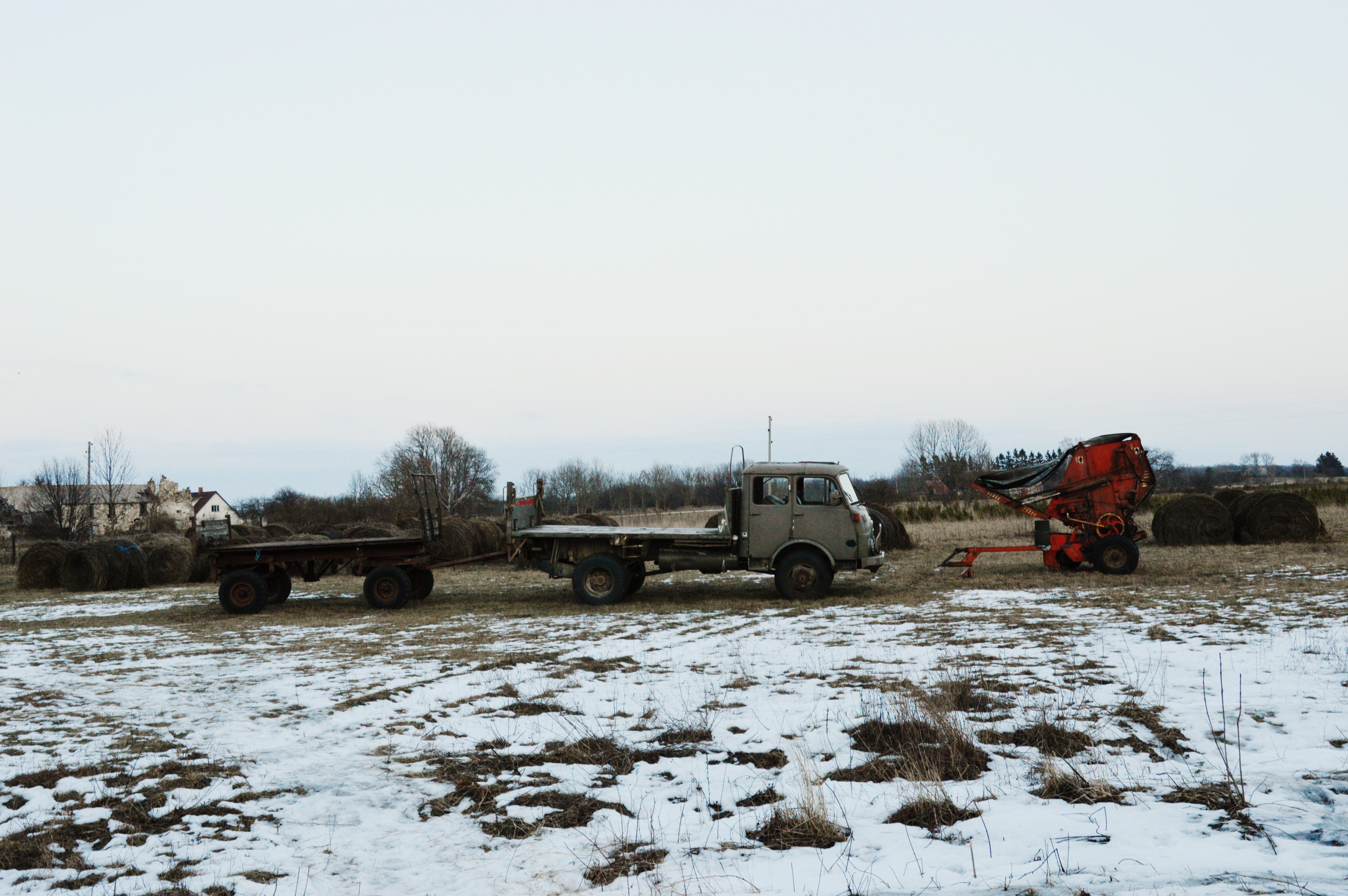
Old machinery

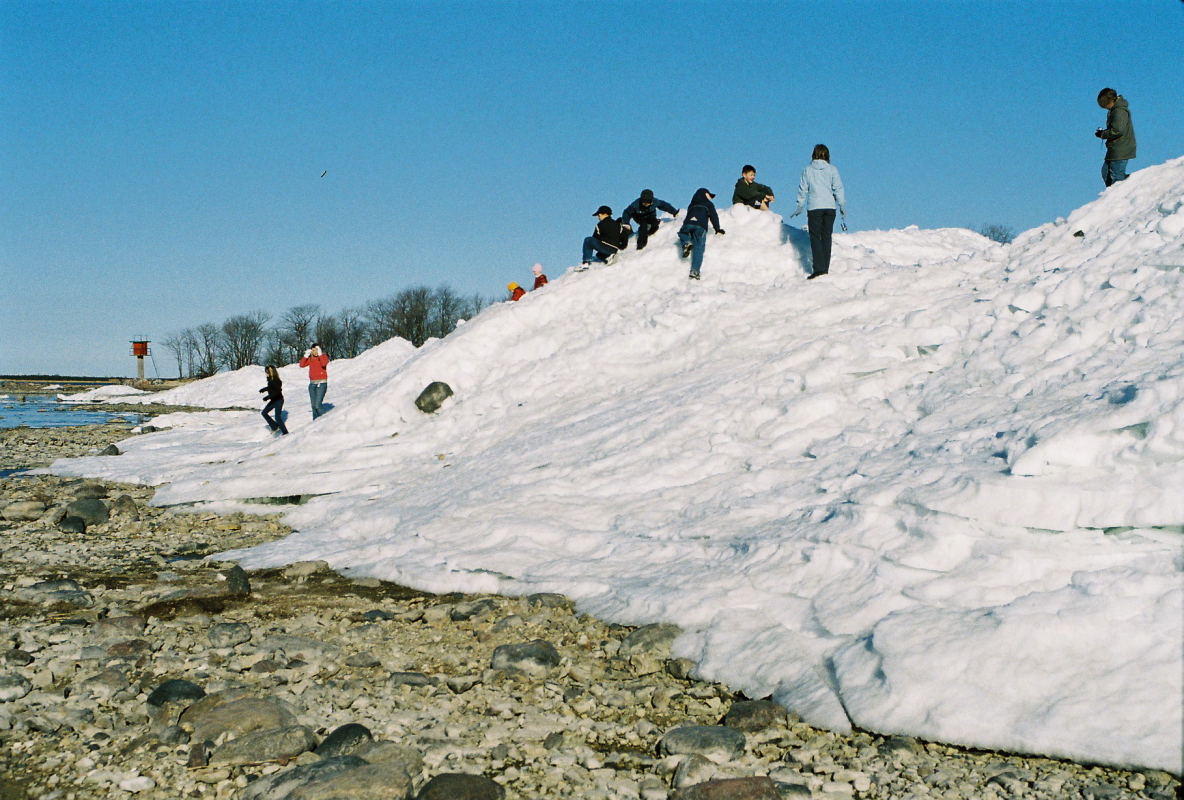
Ice in Puhtu
