= Kuivastu =

Village in Estonia

- Village
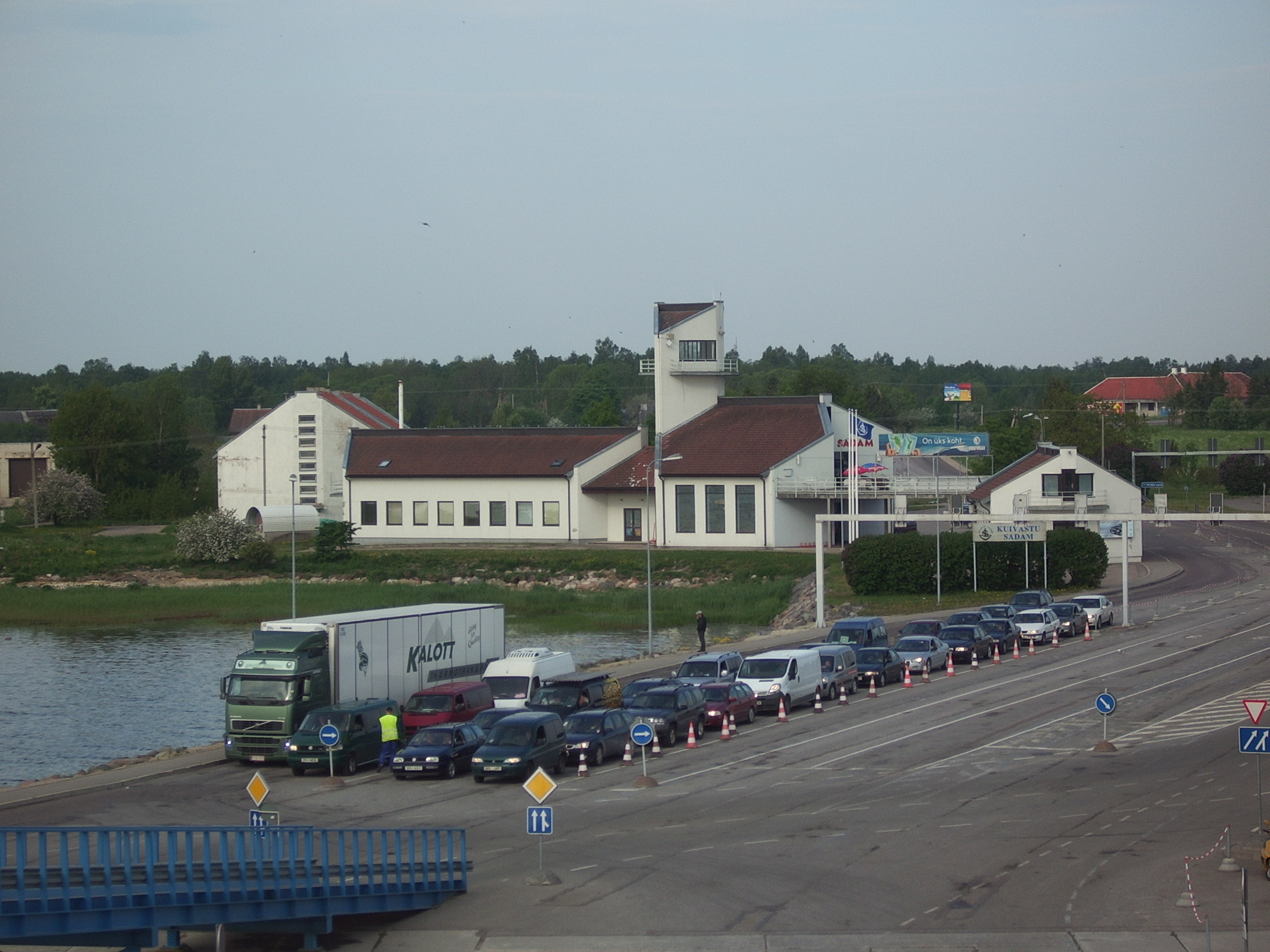
- Kuivastu Harbour

- Location in Estonia
- Coordinates: 58°34′41″N 23°22′22″E
- Country: Estonia
- County: Saare County
- Municipality: Muhu Parish

Population (01.01.2000)
  - Total: 73

Kuivastu is a village on the eastern coast of the Estonian island of Muhu. Kuivastu Harbour is the primary gateway to the largest Estonian island, Saaremaa (Muhu and Saaremaa are separate islands, but since 1896 they have been connected by the Strait Causeway (Estonian: Väinatamm). The corresponding harbour on the continental side is in Virtsu. Kuivastu administratively belongs to Muhu Parish of Saare County. In 2000, the village had a population of 73.

Kuivastu was the location of Kuivastu Manor (Kuiwast).

The poet, translator, linguist, and folklorist Villem Grünthal-Ridala (1885–1942) was born at Kuivastu tavern.

== Gallery ==
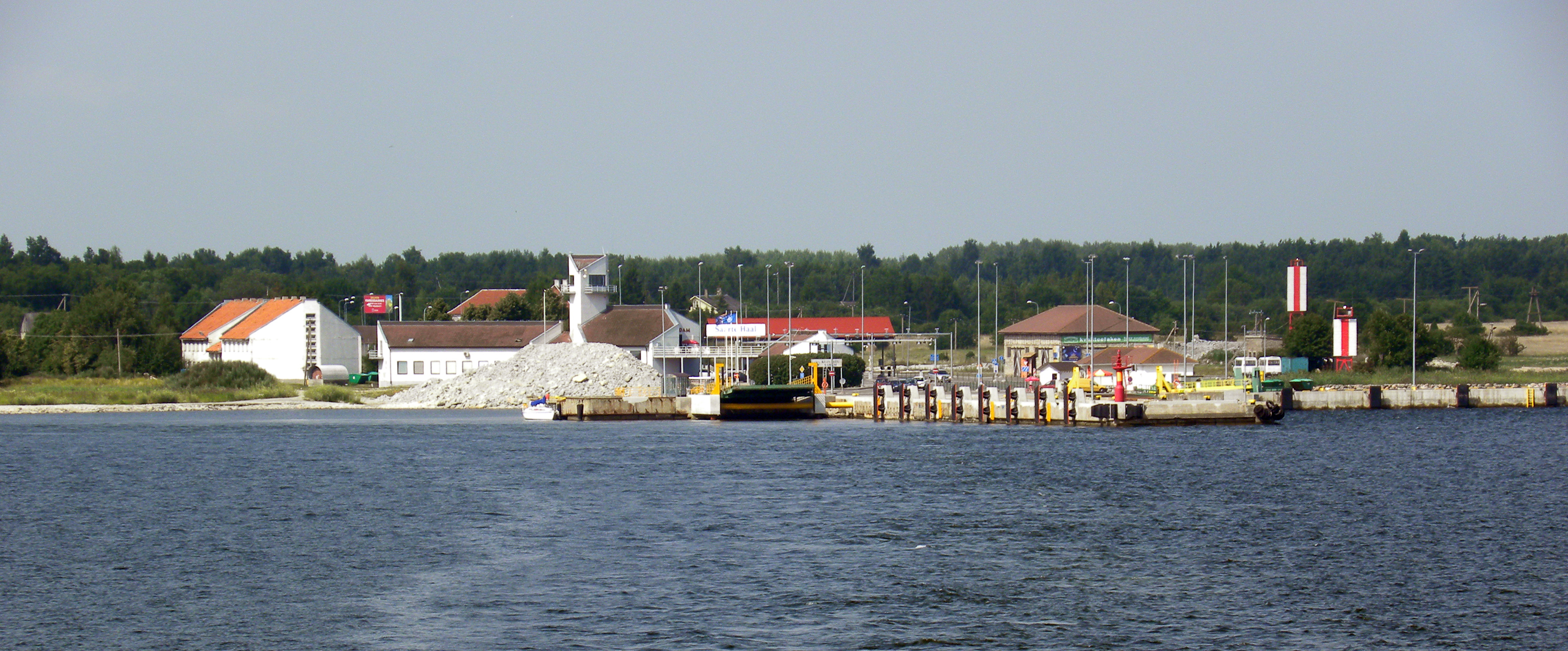
Kuivastu Harbour

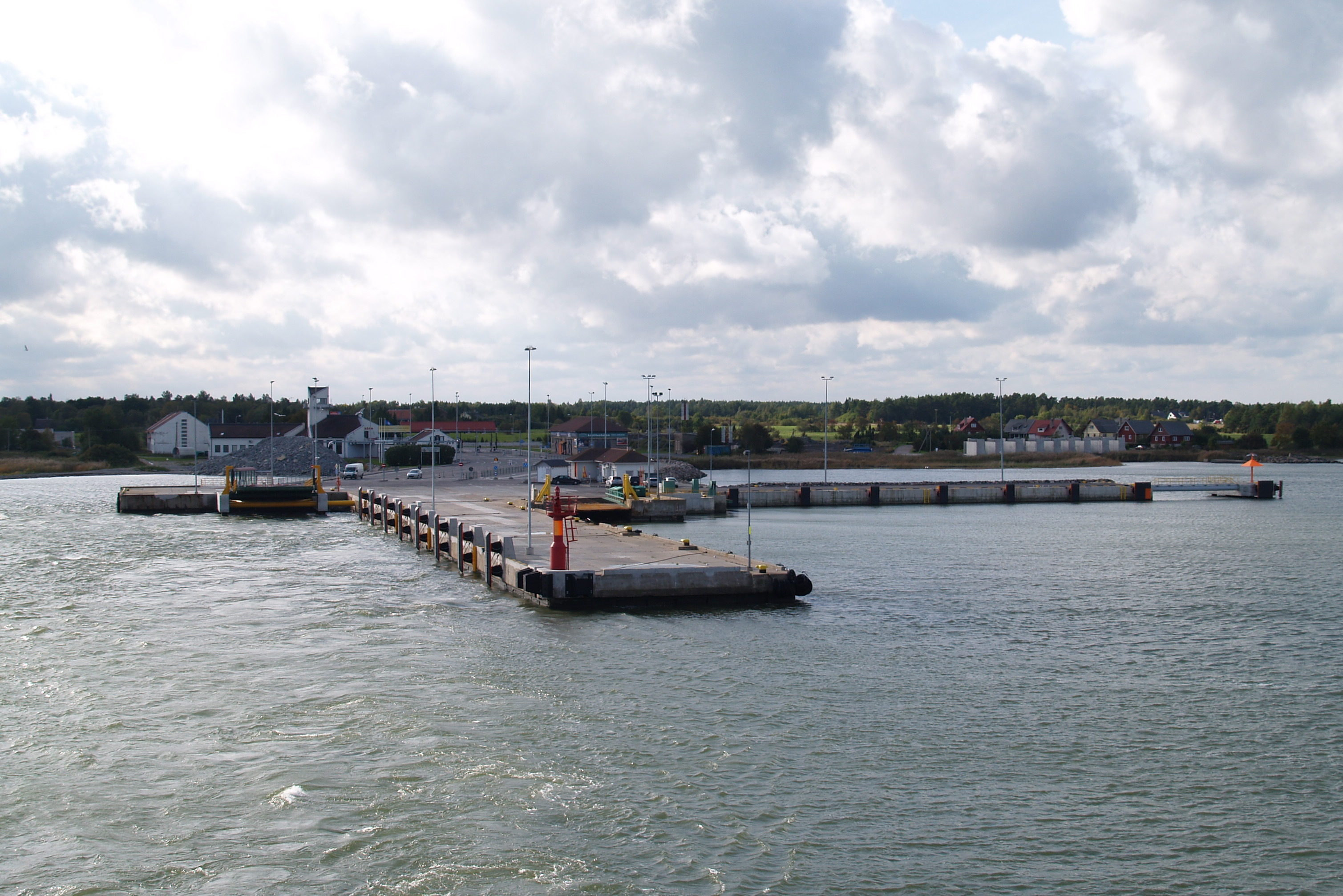

== In popular culture ==
Kuivastu, referred to as Kuivast, is described by the English adventurer writer Arthur Ransome in his nautical yarn Racundra's First Cruise.
