= Puise Peninsula =

Peninsula in Estonia

Coordinates: 58.791°N 23.512°E

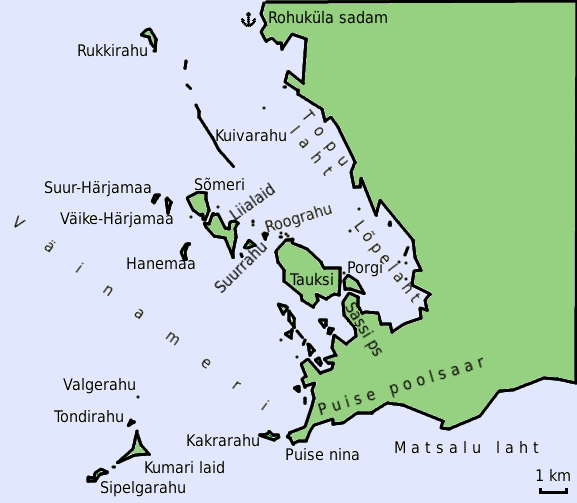
Location of the peninsula

The Puise Peninsula (Estonian: Puise poolsaar) is a peninsula in Lääne County, Estonia. The southern part of the peninsula is bordered by Matsalu Bay.

The length of the peninsula is about 8 km.

The peninsula is part of Matsalu National Park.
