= Rohuküla =

Village in Estonia

Coordinates: 58.90647°N 23.4242°E

- Village
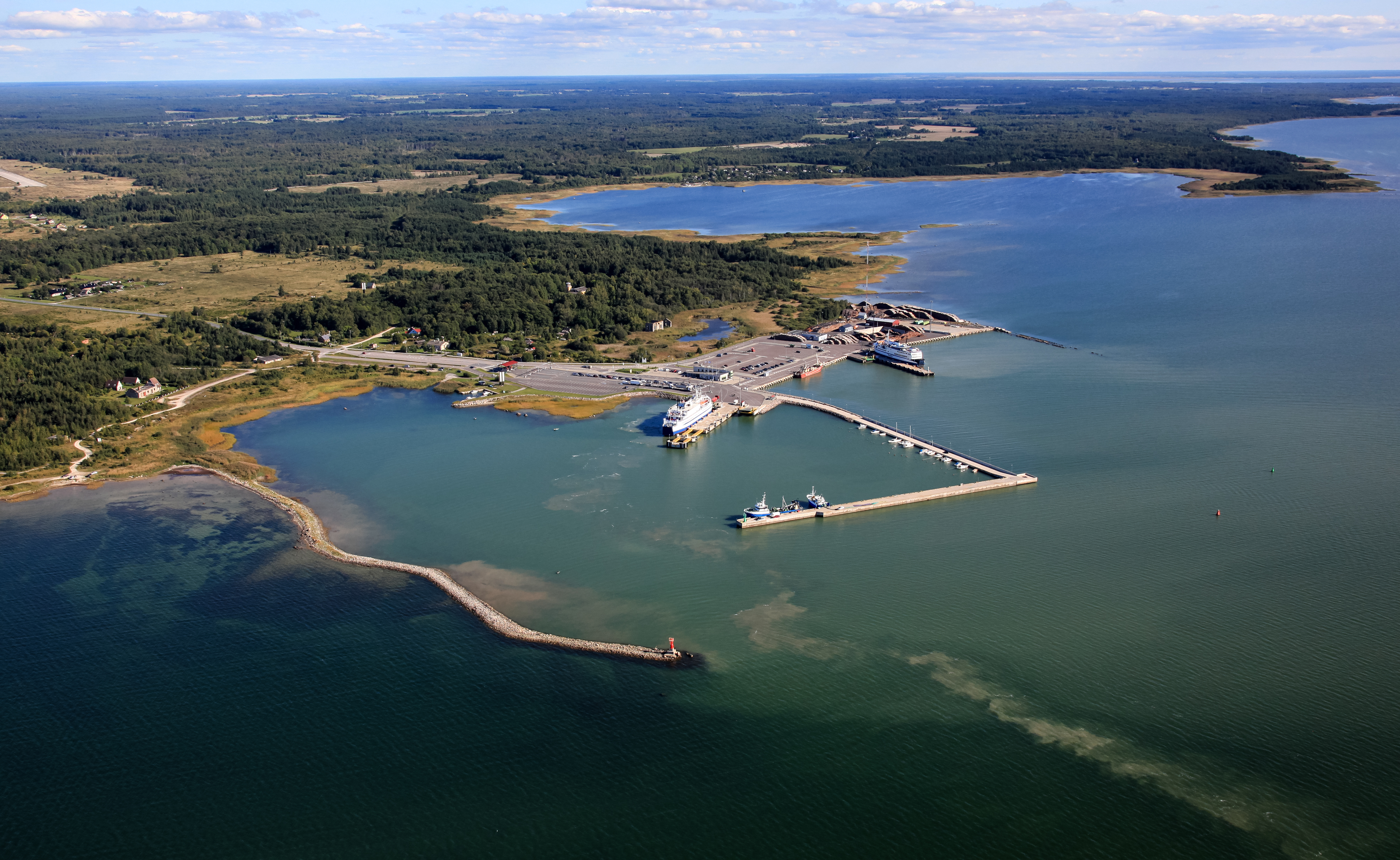
- Rohuküla harbour
- Interactive map of Rohuküla
- Country: Estonia
- County: Lääne County
- Municipality: Haapsalu
- Time zone: UTC+2 (EET)
  - Summer (DST): UTC+3 (EEST)

Rohuküla is a village in Haapsalu municipality, Lääne County, in western Estonia. It is a seaport connecting the mainland with the islands of Hiiumaa (Heltermaa port) and Vormsi (Sviby port). During winter there are two ice roads from the village to the two islands, the one to Hiiumaa being Europe's longest, at 26.5 km. Prior to the 2017 administrative reform of local governments, Rohuküla was located in Ridala Parish.

Rohuküla is the birthplace of artist Enno Hallek.
