= Heltermaa =

Village in Estonia

- Village
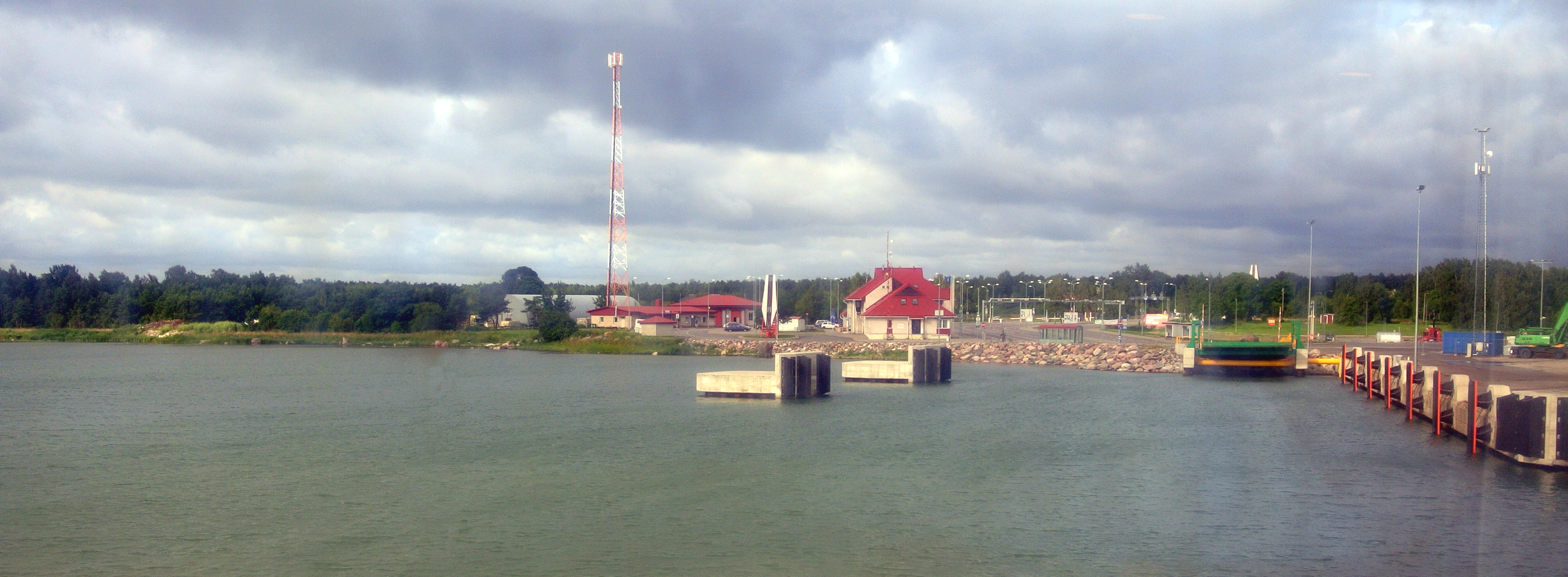
- Port of Heltermaa

- Location within Estonia
- Coordinates: 58°52′N 23°03′E
- Country: Estonia
- County: Hiiu County
- Parish: Hiiumaa Parish
- Time zone: UTC+2 (EET)
  - Summer (DST): UTC+3 (EEST)

Heltermaa is a village in Hiiumaa Parish, Hiiu County, in northwestern Estonia. The village is the site of the seaport connecting Hiiumaa with Rohuküla harbour on the mainland by ferry.

The village was first mentioned in 1620 (Heltermecky). Historically, the village was part of Suuremõisa Manor (German: Grossenhof).

Before 1977, Heltermaa was part of the village of Aruküla.
