= List of protected areas of Estonia =

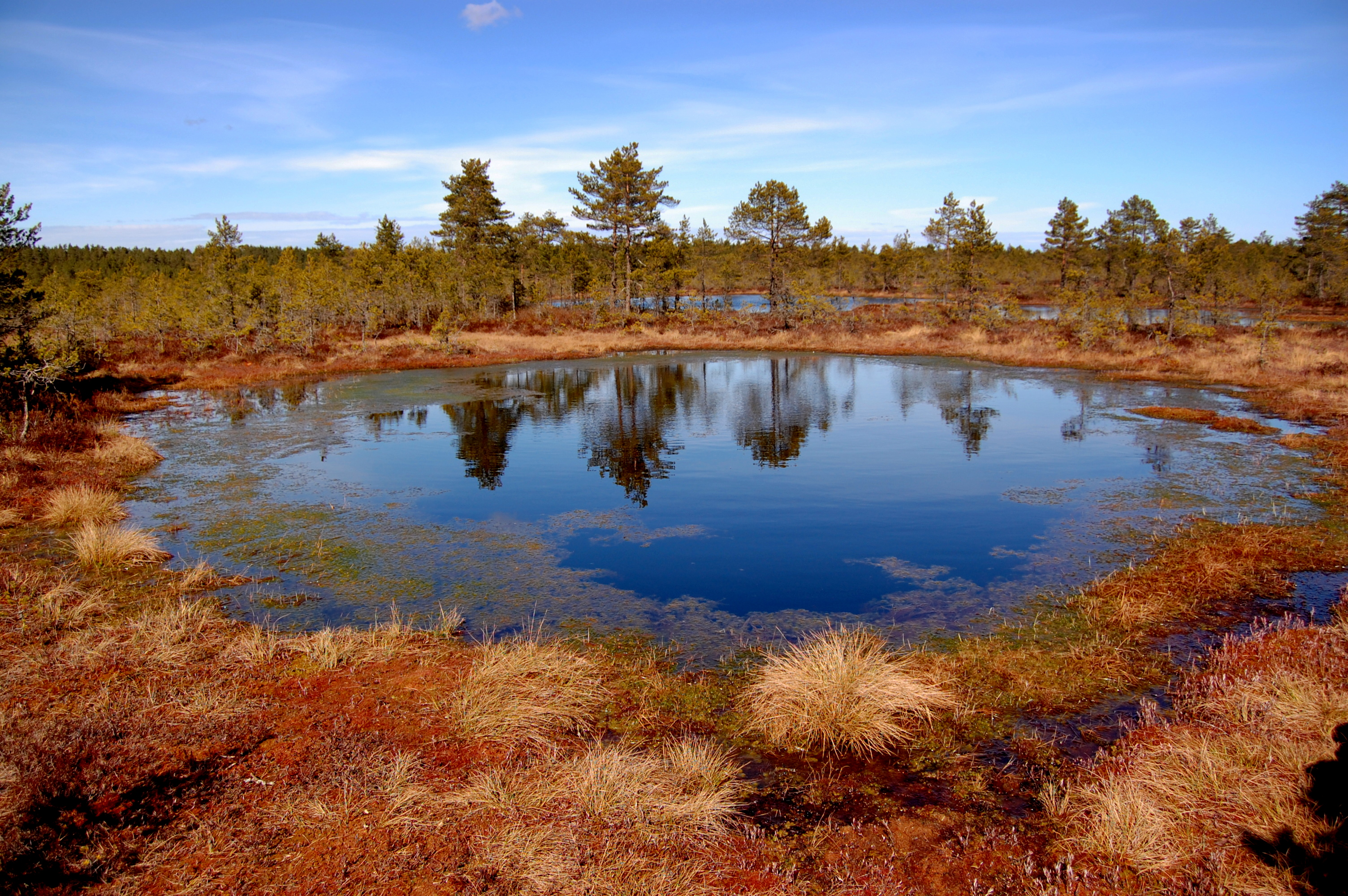
Viru bog in Lahemaa National Park

Protected areas in Estonia are national parks, nature reserves and landscape protection areas (nature parks).

Estonia has five national parks, 167 nature reserves and 152 landscape conservation areas. In addition, there are 116 (118) protected areas with an old (Soviet-era) protection regulation and 537 parks. In total, 18.1% of Estonia are protected nature areas, with Lääne County having the highest percentage (32%) and Põlva County the lowest percentage of protected areas, about 9%.

== National parks ==
Name (English)	Name (Estonian)	Location	Founded in	Area (km^{2})	Coordinates
Alutaguse National Park	Alutaguse rahvuspark	Ida-Viru County, Lüganuse, Jõhvi, Toila and Alutaguse Municipalities	2018	443.31	59°06′N 27°19′E
Karula National Park	Karula rahvuspark	Võru County, Rõuge Parish, Vana-Roosa	1979-09-23	123.6	57.7069°N 26.5058°E
Lahemaa National Park	Lahemaa rahvuspark	Harju County, Kuusalu Parish, Valgejõe	1971-05-31	747.8	59.5817°N 25.8633°E
Matsalu National Park	Matsalu rahvuspark	Pärnu County, Lääneranna Parish, Kelu	1957-07-10	488.6	58.7592°N 23.6483°E
Soomaa National Park	Soomaa rahvuspark	Viljandi County, Põhja-Sakala Parish, Metsküla	1957-07-10	398.4	58.4483°N 25.1194°E
Vilsandi National Park	Vilsandi rahvuspark	Saare County, Saaremaa Parish, Rootsiküla	1937-10-19	238.8	58.3861°N 21.8944°E

== Nature reserves ==
Name (English)	Name (Estonian)	Location	Founded in	Area (km^{2})	Coordinates
Abruka Nature Reserve	Abruka looduskaitseala	Saare County, Saaremaa Parish, Abruka	1937-12-02	41.4	58.1364°N 22.5192°E
Agusalu Nature Reserve	Agusalu looduskaitseala	Ida-Viru County, Alutaguse Parish, Kaatermu	1981-05-24	1106.2	59.0892°N 27.5197°E
Aidu Nature Reserve	Aidu looduskaitseala	Jõgeva County, Põltsamaa Parish, Kaavere	2002-11-18	31.6	58.6969°N 26.2236°E
Akste Nature Reserve	Akste looduskaitseala	Põlva County, Põlva Parish, Kiidjärve	1977-08-30	18.9	58.1661°N 27.0136°E
Alema Nature Reserve	Alema looduskaitseala	Harju County, Saue Parish, Madila	1981-12-28	6	59.0869°N 24.3292°E
Alam-Pedja Nature Reserve	Alam-Pedja looduskaitseala	Tartu County, Tartu, Ilmatsalu	1994-02-16	3439.6	58.4739°N 26.1697°E
Allirahu Nature Reserve	Allirahu looduskaitseala	Saare County, Saaremaa Parish, Suure-Rootsi	2005-07-20	197.1	58.1572°N 22.7986°E
Altnurga Nature Reserve	Altnurga looduskaitseala	Jõgeva County, Põltsamaa Parish, Altnurga	2015-04-16	9.8	58.5503°N 26.3833°E
Anija Nature Reserve	Anija looduskaitseala	Harju County, Anija Parish, Anija	1990-04-23	7.2	59.3725°N 25.2767°E
Anne Nature Reserve	Anne looduskaitseala	Tartu County, Luunja Parish, Lohkva	1986-07-28	1.6	58.3631°N 26.7775°E
Audru Polder's Nature Reserve	Audru poldri looduskaitseala	Pärnu County, Pärnu, Valgeranna	2014-10-09	100.1	58.3872°N 24.3236°E
Avaste Nature Reserve	Avaste looduskaitseala	Pärnu County, Lääneranna Parish, Rumba	1981-05-24	884.1	58.6831°N 24.2139°E
Endla Nature Reserve	Endla looduskaitseala	Jõgeva County, Jõgeva Parish, Endla	1939-09-07	1016.1	58.8644°N 26.1278°E
Haavassoo Nature Reserve	Haavassoo looduskaitseala	Saare County, Saaremaa Parish, Hirmuste	2013-12-19	40.1	58.2442°N 22.2025°E
Hüti Nature Reserve	Hüti looduskaitseala	Hiiu County, Hiiumaa Parish, Hüti	2013-11-10	3.1	58.9133°N 22.4744°E
Ihamaru Nature Reserve	Ihamaru looduskaitseala	Põlva County, Põlva Parish, Aarna	1981-09-29	25.5	58.1006°N 26.9336°E
Iidva Nature Reserve	Iidva looduskaitseala	Järva County, Türi Parish, Kolu	2006-07-26	8.1	58.8547°N 25.2989°E
Järveküla Nature Reserve	Järveküla looduskaitseala	Viljandi County, Viljandi Parish, Maltsa	1990-08-20	26.9	58.1606°N 26.0158°E
Järvselja Nature Reserve	Järvselja looduskaitseala	Tartu County, Kastre Parish, Agali	1957-07-10	18.8	58.2778°N 27.3239°E
Jäärumetsa Nature Reserve	Jäärumetsa looduskaitseala	Pärnu County, Lääneranna Parish, Kilgi	2007-02-15	33.3	58.4258°N 23.9°E
Kahvena Nature Reserve	Kahvena looduskaitseala	Viljandi County, Põhja-Sakala Parish, Seruküla	2005-06-08	6.6	58.2764°N 25.2356°E
Kabli Nature Reserve	Kabli looduskaitseala	Pärnu County, Häädemeeste Parish, Kabli	1991-07-11	7.4	58.0083°N 24.4275°E
Kalita Nature Reserve	Kalita looduskaitseala	Pärnu County, Saarde Parish, Kalita	2007-04-25	14.6	58.0678°N 24.85°E
Kalana Nature Reserve	Kalana looduskaitseala	Hiiu County, Hiiumaa Parish, Kalana	2013-12-19	3.3	58.9181°N 22.1008°E
Kareda Nature Reserve	Kareda looduskaitseala	Järva County, Järva Parish, Kahala	2005-07-13	36.3	58.9272°N 25.7747°E
Karinõmme Nature Reserve	Karinõmme looduskaitseala	Pärnu County, Lääneranna Parish, Tarva	2006-12-20	38.9	58.6119°N 23.9853°E
Keeri-Karijärve Nature Reserve	Keeri-Karijärve looduskaitseala	Tartu County, Elva Parish, Härjanurme	2006-02-27	192	58.3072°N 26.4381°E
Keisripalu Nature Reserve	Keisripalu looduskaitseala	Valga County, Tõrva Parish, Möldre	2013-10-09	3.3	58.0183°N 25.9153°E
Kesknõmme Nature Reserve	Kesknõmme looduskaitseala	Saare County, Saaremaa Parish, Kehila	2005-08-10	33.9	58.4422°N 22.0364°E
Kergu Nature Reserve	Kergu looduskaitseala	Pärnu County, Põhja-Pärnumaa Parish, Metsaküla	2007-04-25	43.5	58.6467°N 24.7961°E
Kihnu Islets Nature Reserve	Kihnu laidude looduskaitseala	Pärnu County, Kihnu Parish, Linaküla	2014-03-03	420	58.1781°N 23.9064°E
Kikepera Nature Reserve	Kikepera looduskaitseala	Pärnu County, Pärnu, Põlendmaa	2017-04-16	1073.3	58.2608°N 24.9964°E
Kirikuraba Nature Reserve	Kirikuraba looduskaitseala	Jõgeva County, Põltsamaa Parish, Tõrve	2013-10-20	44.7	58.5836°N 26.3906°E
Kivimurru Nature Reserve	Kivimurru looduskaitseala	Jõgeva County, Mustvee Parish, Võtikvere	2013-11-10	5.5	58.8647°N 26.9178°E
Koimla Nature Reserve	Koimla looduskaitseala	Saare County, Saaremaa Parish, Koimla	2013-11-10	3.2	58.2175°N 22.1628°E
Kolga Nature Reserve	Kolga looduskaitseala	Pärnu County, Pärnu, Rammuka	1991-07-11	27.6	58.3839°N 23.8383°E
Konguta Nature Reserve	Konguta looduskaitseala	Tartu County, Elva Parish, Konguta	2006-03-09	3.3	58.2125°N 26.2792°E
Koorküla Nature Reserve	Koorküla looduskaitseala	Valga County, Tõrva Parish, Jeti	1959-12-10	35.3	57.8944°N 25.8639°E
Koorunõmme Nature Reserve	Koorunõmme looduskaitseala	Saare County, Saaremaa Parish, Merise	1965-04-02	127.2	58.4736°N 22.1569°E
Kuiaru Nature Reserve	Kuiaru looduskaitseala	Pärnu County, Tori Parish, Kuiaru	2007-03-29	22.2	58.4878°N 24.7297°E
Kukka Nature Reserve	Kukka looduskaitseala	Hiiu County, Hiiumaa Parish, Palade	2017-03-30	16.9	58.9647°N 22.8697°E
Kurisoo Nature Reserve	Kurisoo looduskaitseala	Järva County, Järva Parish, Ahula	2005-08-10	4.7	59.1253°N 25.7683°E
Kurimetsa Nature Reserve	Kurimetsa looduskaitseala	Viljandi County, Mulgi Parish, Ainja	1998-11-16	5.7	58.0794°N 25.6794°E
Kämbla Nature Reserve	Kämbla looduskaitseala	Harju County, Kose Parish, Tuhala	1991-12-17	1.6	59.2175°N 25.0125°E
Kärasi Nature Reserve	Kärasi looduskaitseala	Jõgeva County, Mustvee Parish, Tammispää	2017-02-09	59.8	58.9461°N 26.9786°E
Kärevere Nature Reserve	Kärevere looduskaitseala	Tartu County, Tartu Parish, Maramaa	2007-05-17	179.8	58.4442°N 26.5219°E
Kõpu Nature Reserve	Kõpu looduskaitseala	Hiiu County, Hiiumaa Parish, Heistesoo	1958-05-27	308	58.9153°N 22.2067°E
Kõrgessaare Nature Reserve	Kõrgessaare looduskaitseala	Hiiu County, Hiiumaa Parish, Kõrgessaare	2009-04-08	7	58.9756°N 22.5017°E
Laidevahe Nature Reserve	Laidevahe looduskaitseala	Saare County, Saaremaa Parish, Matsiranna	2002-11-04	245.5	58.3186°N 22.8581°E
Laidu Island Nature Reserve	Laidu saare looduskaitseala	Saare County, Saaremaa Parish, Võhma	1965-04-02	1.9	58.5211°N 22.2806°E
Lasila Nature Reserve	Lasila looduskaitseala	Lääne-Viru County, Rakvere Parish, Lasila	2016-02-03	31.5	59.2536°N 26.1897°E
Laiksaare Nature Reserve	Laiksaare looduskaitseala	Pärnu County, Saarde Parish, Laiksaare	2006-07-12	40.1	58.1072°N 24.6403°E
Lauaru Nature Reserve	Lauaru looduskaitseala	Pärnu County, Lääneranna Parish, Piisu	2014-04-23	8.8	58.5939°N 24.1208°E
Laulaste Nature Reserve	Laulaste looduskaitseala	Pärnu County, Häädemeeste Parish, Majaka	2005-12-21	106.6	57.9733°N 24.5314°E
Laukesoo Nature Reserve	Laukesoo looduskaitseala	Harju County, Kose Parish, Virla	1981-05-24	255.6	59.0428°N 25.305°E
Lavassaare Nature Reserve	Lavassaare looduskaitseala	Pärnu County, Põhja-Pärnumaa Parish, Pitsalu	2016-05-04	1113.2	58.5536°N 24.255°E
Lehtsaare Nature Reserve	Lehtsaare looduskaitseala	Viljandi County, Põhja-Sakala Parish, Karjasoo	1992-11-08	38	58.5278°N 25.3147°E
Leidissoo Nature Reserve	Leidissoo looduskaitseala	Lääne County, Lääne-Nigula Parish, Nõmmemaa	2002-11-04	822.1	59.0947°N 23.7208°E
Leigri Nature Reserve	Leigri looduskaitseala	Hiiu County, Hiiumaa Parish, Leigri	1998-05-04	46.1	58.8933°N 22.5806°E
Leppoja Nature Reserve	Leppoja looduskaitseala	Viljandi County, Põhja-Sakala Parish, Metsküla	2005-10-16	3.8	58.3839°N 25.3342°E
Liiva-Putla Nature Reserve	Liiva-Putla looduskaitseala	Saare County, Saaremaa Parish, Haeska	2007-05-07	10.2	58.4033°N 22.6533°E
Lindi Nature Reserve	Lindi looduskaitseala	Pärnu County, Pärnu, Kõpu	1958-09-11	110.1	58.3258°N 24.2028°E
Linnuraba Nature Reserve	Linnuraba looduskaitseala	Rapla County, Rapla Parish, Kodila	1959-03-01	339.4	59.0639°N 24.5922°E
Luhasoo Nature Reserve	Luhasoo looduskaitseala	Võru County, Rõuge Parish, Kellämäe	2017-06-21	71.1	57.6461°N 26.9067°E
Luusika Nature Reserve	Luusika looduskaitseala	Lääne-Viru County, Vinni Parish, Salutaguse	1992-04-29	44.2	59.0083°N 26.5814°E
Luitemaa Nature Reserve	Luitemaa looduskaitseala	Pärnu County, Saarde Parish, Ilvese	1939-01-26	1130.1	58.1586°N 24.5683°E
Lähkma Nature Reserve	Lähkma looduskaitseala	Pärnu County, Saarde Parish, Kikepera	2007-04-25	10.3	58.2758°N 24.8339°E
Maalasti Nature Reserve	Maalasti looduskaitseala	Viljandi County, Põhja-Sakala Parish, Saviaugu	2013-12-19	53	58.5931°N 25.6936°E
Maapaju Nature Reserve	Maapaju looduskaitseala	Harju County, Anija Parish, Pillapalu	2005-06-05	45.1	59.3214°N 25.5189°E
Madissaare Nature Reserve	Madissaare looduskaitseala	Pärnu County, Lääneranna Parish, Tarva	2007-04-25	10.1	58.6042°N 24.0275°E
Mahtra Nature Reserve	Mahtra looduskaitseala	Harju County, Kose Parish, Habaja	1959-03-01	761	59.0925°N 24.9872°E
Mahu-Rannametsa Nature Reserve	Mahu-Rannametsa looduskaitseala	Lääne-Viru County, Viru-Nigula Parish, Kalvi	2006-02-27	41.3	59.4914°N 26.7372°E
Maruoru Nature Reserve	Maruoru looduskaitseala	Põlva County, Kanepi Parish, Hino	2001-11-26	3.2	57.9892°N 26.6806°E
Marimetsa Nature Reserve	Marimetsa looduskaitseala	Lääne County, Lääne-Nigula Parish, Jaakna	1981-05-24	508.3	58.94°N 24.0019°E
Meelva Nature Reserve	Meelva looduskaitseala	Põlva County, Räpina Parish, Kõnnu	2016-12-28	213.7	58.1586°N 27.3375°E
Meenikunno Nature Reserve	Meenikunno looduskaitseala	Võru County, Võru Parish, Rebasmäe	2015-11-25	302.8	57.9425°N 27.3189°E
Metsaääre Nature Reserve	Metsaääre looduskaitseala	Pärnu County, Saarde Parish, Jaamaküla	2007-03-29	16	58.2867°N 24.7039°E
Mihkli Nature Reserve	Mihkli looduskaitseala	Pärnu County, Lääneranna Parish, Mihkli	1957-07-10	8.9	58.6217°N 24.1125°E
Muraste Nature Reserve	Muraste looduskaitseala	Harju County, Harku Parish, Ilmandu	2005-08-17	14.1	59.4642°N 24.4433°E
Muraka Nature Reserve	Muraka looduskaitseala	Ida-Viru County, Alutaguse Parish, Alliku	1957-07-10	1405.9	59.1486°N 27.1147°E
Mustallika Nature Reserve	Mustallika looduskaitseala	Jõgeva County, Jõgeva Parish, Ellakvere	1992-07-28	5	58.715°N 26.43°E
Mõisamõtsa Nature Reserve	Mõisamõtsa looduskaitseala	Võru County, Rõuge Parish, Pähni	2005-04-20	2.2	57.5803°N 26.6553°E
Nabala-Tuhala Nature Reserve	Nabala-Tuhala looduskaitseala	Rapla County, Kohila Parish, Angerja	2014-11-16	462.9	59.2214°N 24.8625°E
Naissoo Nature Reserve	Naissoo looduskaitseala	Pärnu County, Lääneranna Parish, Naissoo	1964-02-04	11.6	58.6094°N 24.1778°E
Nedrema Nature Reserve	Nedrema looduskaitseala	Pärnu County, Lääneranna Parish, Urita	1991-07-11	244.2	58.5425°N 24.0658°E
Nigula Nature Reserve	Nigula looduskaitseala	Pärnu County, Häädemeeste Parish, Nepste	1957-07-10	643.1	58.0111°N 24.6831°E
Nehatu Nature Reserve	Nehatu looduskaitseala	Pärnu County, Lääneranna Parish, Muriste	1957-07-10	101.7	58.5472°N 23.6581°E
Niinsoni Nature Reserve	Niinsoni looduskaitseala	Harju County, Anija Parish, Pillapalu	2000-11-13	11.1	59.33°N 25.5636°E
Nätsi-Võlla Nature Reserve	Nätsi-Võlla looduskaitseala	Pärnu County, Pärnu, Eassalu	1957-07-10	1161.7	58.4567°N 24.0814°E
Nõmme Mire Nature Reserve	Nõmme raba looduskaitseala	Järva County, Türi Parish, Kärevere	2006-01-22	43.7	58.6992°N 25.4508°E
Ohepalu Nature Reserve	Ohepalu looduskaitseala	Lääne-Viru County, Kadrina Parish, Arbavere	1973-03-19	593.5	59.3492°N 25.93°E
Nõva Nature Reserve	Nõva looduskaitseala	Lääne County, Lääne-Nigula Parish, Vaisi	2017-10-25	239	59.2011°N 23.6194°E
Orkjärve Nature Reserve	Orkjärve looduskaitseala	Harju County, Saue Parish, Jaanika	2005-07-06	115.5	59.1436°N 24.2472°E
Paadenurme Nature Reserve	Paadenurme looduskaitseala	Lääne-Viru County, Vinni Parish, Kaasiksaare	1992-04-29	34.5	59.0325°N 26.8564°E
Paadrema Nature Reserve	Paadrema looduskaitseala	Pärnu County, Lääneranna Parish, Nõmme	2003-01-06	136.4	58.5147°N 23.7625°E
Padakõrve Nature Reserve	Padakõrve looduskaitseala	Tartu County, Peipsiääre Parish, Selgise	1964-09-08	155.5	58.5997°N 27.0156°E
Paope Nature Reserve	Paope looduskaitseala	Hiiu County, Hiiumaa Parish, Isabella	2006-10-25	222.7	58.9725°N 22.4494°E
Paraspõllu Nature Reserve	Paraspõllu looduskaitseala	Harju County, Rae Parish, Urvaste	1999-12-14	47.9	59.2972°N 25.1036°E
Parika Nature Reserve	Parika looduskaitseala	Viljandi County, Põhja-Sakala Parish, Kuhjavere	1981-05-24	219.3	58.5083°N 25.7733°E
Parila Nature Reserve	Parila looduskaitseala	Harju County, Anija Parish, Parila	2016-09-22	20.8	59.3244°N 25.2414°E
Parmu Nature Reserve	Parmu looduskaitseala	Võru County, Rõuge Parish, Parmu	2006-07-06	102.7	57.5561°N 27.305°E
Peipsiveere Nature Reserve	Peipsiveere looduskaitseala	Tartu County, Kastre Parish, Ahunapalu	2013-12-19	346.1	58.3808°N 27.3183°E
Pihla-Kaibaldi Nature Reserve	Pihla-Kaibaldi looduskaitseala	Hiiu County, Hiiumaa Parish, Pilpaküla	1998-04-28	37.8	58.9342°N 22.6906°E
Piusa Caves Nature Reserve	Piusa koobastiku looduskaitseala	Võru County, Võru Parish, Piusa	1981-09-29	4.8	57.8431°N 27.4656°E
Prandi Nature Reserve	Prandi looduskaitseala	Järva County, Järva Parish, Koigi	1981-01-25	87.6	58.8283°N 25.6522°E
Puhatu Nature Reserve	Puhatu looduskaitseala	Ida-Viru County, Alutaguse Parish, Kuningaküla	1967-01-16	1282.4	59.1461°N 27.7325°E
Puhtu-Laelatu Nature Reserve	Puhtu-Laelatu looduskaitseala	Pärnu County, Lääneranna Parish, Hanila	1939-01-26	305.8	58.5667°N 23.5431°E
Pähklisaar Nature Reserve	Pähklisaare looduskaitseala	Tartu County, Peipsiääre Parish, Põrgu	2016-11-16	77	58.435°N 27.0081°E
Pähni Nature Reserve	Pähni looduskaitseala	Võru County, Rõuge Parish, Pähni	2006-03-02	27.8	57.6386°N 26.7744°E
Pärnu Grasslands Nature Reserve	Pärnu rannaniidu looduskaitseala	Pärnu County, Häädemeeste Parish, Reiu	1958-09-11	39.7	58.3642°N 24.5128°E
Põhja-Kõrvemaa Nature Reserve	Põhja-Kõrvemaa looduskaitseala	Harju County, Kuusalu Parish, Pala	1991-10-28	1315.8	59.3808°N 25.6764°E
Pühametsa Nature Reserve	Pühametsa looduskaitseala	Saare County, Saaremaa Parish, Kõljala	2007-05-16	0.6	58.3603°N 22.69°E
Raadi Nature Reserve	Raadi looduskaitseala	Tartu County, Luunja Parish, Rõõmu	2015-10-21	8.7	58.3914°N 26.7697°E
Rahuste Nature Reserve	Rahuste looduskaitseala	Saare County, Saaremaa Parish, Rahuste	1965-04-02	69.2	58.1081°N 22.1189°E
Raudna Nature Reserve	Raudna looduskaitseala	Viljandi County, Viljandi Parish, Raudna	1994-06-01	3	58.3361°N 25.4731°E
Riidaja Nature Reserve	Riidaja looduskaitseala	Valga County, Tõrva Parish, Riidaja	2013-08-08	1.3	58.1033°N 25.9058°E
Ropka-Ihaste Nature Reserve	Ropka-Ihaste looduskaitseala	Tartu County, Kastre Parish, Aardlapalu	2014-10-16	79.1	58.3367°N 26.7603°E
Rubina Nature Reserve	Rubina looduskaitseala	Valga County, Tõrva Parish, Voorbahi	2005-04-07	21.1	58.0753°N 25.7653°E
Ruila Nature Reserve	Ruila looduskaitseala	Harju County, Saue Parish, Mõnuste	2005-06-05	83.1	59.1631°N 24.4172°E
Rumbi Nature Reserve	Rumbi looduskaitseala	Järva County, Türi Parish, Lungu	2001-07-23	0.7	58.8861°N 25.1858°E
Sanga Nature Reserve	Sanga looduskaitseala	Pärnu County, Saarde Parish, Leipste	2005-09-27	15.2	58.1225°N 25.0883°E
Selisoo Nature Reserve	Selisoo looduskaitseala	Ida-Viru County, Alutaguse Parish, Väike-Pungerja	2015-09-30	144.4	59.1819°N 27.2708°E
Siiraku Nature Reserve	Siiraku looduskaitseala	Pärnu County, Saarde Parish, Lähkma	2007-04-02	68.6	58.2311°N 24.7933°E
Silma Nature Reserve	Silma looduskaitseala	Lääne County, Lääne-Nigula Parish, Vedra	1998-09-24	669.5	59.0153°N 23.5919°E
Silmsi Nature Reserve	Silmsi looduskaitseala	Järva County, Järva Parish, Vaali	2005-07-06	14.6	58.8744°N 25.9331°E
Siplase Nature Reserve	Siplase looduskaitseala	Saare County, Saaremaa Parish, Iide	2007-05-07	20.7	57.9803°N 22.0931°E
Sirtsi Nature Reserve	Sirtsi looduskaitseala	Lääne-Viru County, Vinni Parish, Kaukvere	1981-05-24	684.1	59.2581°N 26.7931°E
Soo-otsa Nature Reserve	Soo-otsa looduskaitseala	Pärnu County, Saarde Parish, Kikepera	2007-03-29	7.4	58.3364°N 24.8675°E
Sookuninga Nature Reserve	Sookuninga looduskaitseala	Pärnu County, Saarde Parish, Jäärja	1964-02-04	590.1	57.9969°N 24.8297°E
Soontaga Nature Reserve	Soontaga looduskaitseala	Valga County, Tõrva Parish, Soontaga	2006-07-26	122.5	58.0283°N 26.0856°E
Sorgu Nature Reserve	Sorgu looduskaitseala	Pärnu County, Pärnu, Manija	2014-03-06	2.7	58.1739°N 24.1961°E
Sopimetsa Nature Reserve	Sopimetsa looduskaitseala	Jõgeva County, Põltsamaa Parish, Sopimetsa	2013-07-03	0.4	58.7722°N 26.0122°E
Suigu Nature Reserve	Suigu looduskaitseala	Lääne-Viru County, Vinni Parish, Suigu	1976-03-16	8.3	59.1394°N 26.8186°E
Suuremõisa Bay Nature Reserve	Suuremõisa lahe looduskaitseala	Saare County, Muhu Parish, Laheküla	2017-12-13	41.6	58.5533°N 23.2311°E
Suure-Aru Nature Reserve	Suure-Aru looduskaitseala	Harju County, Lääne-Harju Parish, Ohtu	2014-11-19	70.3	59.2331°N 24.4003°E
Suurupi Nature Reserve	Suurupi looduskaitseala	Harju County, Harku Parish, Vääna-Jõesuu	2009-10-21	19.2	59.4625°N 24.3667°E
Säärenõmme Nature Reserve	Säärenõmme looduskaitseala	Saare County, Saaremaa Parish, Liigalaskma	2005-12-11	39.5	58.5844°N 22.9708°E
Sääre Nature Reserve	Sääre looduskaitseala	Saare County, Saaremaa Parish, Sääre	2018-02-28	0	57.8967°N 22.035°E
Taarikõnnu Nature Reserve	Taarikõnnu looduskaitseala	Rapla County, Kehtna Parish, Ellamaa	2001-05-29	283.5	58.7053°N 24.8728°E
Tahkuna Nature Reserve	Tahkuna looduskaitseala	Hiiu County, Hiiumaa Parish, Tareste	1958-05-27	187.9	59.0556°N 22.6281°E
Teesu Nature Reserve	Teesu looduskaitseala	Saare County, Saaremaa Parish, Kallaste	2007-04-25	15.3	58.4211°N 22.0814°E
Tihu Nature Reserve	Tihu looduskaitseala	Hiiu County, Hiiumaa Parish, Männamaa	1961-09-19	140.7	58.8681°N 22.5006°E
Tellise Nature Reserve	Tellise looduskaitseala	Jõgeva County, Mustvee Parish, Võtikvere	2005-06-05	23.8	58.8386°N 26.8811°E
Timmase Nature Reserve	Timmase looduskaitseala	Võru County, Võru Parish, Juba	2004-04-29	38.6	57.8147°N 26.8817°E
Tillniidu Nature Reserve	Tillniidu looduskaitseala	Rapla County, Kehtna Parish, Koogiste	2001-07-23	3.8	58.8106°N 25.0072°E
Tolkuse Nature Reserve	Tolkuse looduskaitseala	Pärnu County, Saarde Parish, Ilvese	2007-02-07	81	58.1558°N 24.6658°E
Toolse Nature Reserve	Toolse looduskaitseala	Lääne-Viru County, Viru-Nigula Parish, Ojaküla	1978-12-10	46.8	59.5217°N 26.4894°E
Tudusoo Nature Reserve	Tudusoo looduskaitseala	Lääne-Viru County, Vinni Parish, Palasi	1981-05-24	474.9	59.1456°N 26.7511°E
Tõrasoo Nature Reserve	Tõrasoo looduskaitseala	Rapla County, Rapla Parish, Metsküla	2005-06-15	330.6	58.8208°N 24.6933°E
Tuhu Nature Reserve	Tuhu looduskaitseala	Pärnu County, Lääneranna Parish, Kiska	1981-05-24	392.7	58.5742°N 23.8608°E
Tündre Nature Reserve	Tündre looduskaitseala	Valga County, Tõrva Parish, Holdre	1999-12-20	184.7	57.9567°N 25.6228°E
Uhtju Nature Reserve	Uhtju looduskaitseala	Lääne-Viru County, Haljala Parish, Toolse	1938-05-10	295.6	59.6769°N 26.5219°E
Vahenurme Nature Reserve	Vahenurme looduskaitseala	Pärnu County, Põhja-Pärnumaa Parish, Vahenurme	2006-03-09	22.3	58.6458°N 24.3933°E
Vaiste Nature Reserve	Vaiste looduskaitseala	Pärnu County, Lääneranna Parish, Saare	2007-04-25	16.1	58.3633°N 23.8675°E
Valgesoo Nature Reserve	Valgesoo looduskaitseala	Põlva County, Põlva Parish, Kiidjärve	2016-09-14	34.3	58.1456°N 27.0733°E
Varangu Nature Reserve	Varangu looduskaitseala	Lääne-Viru County, Väike-Maarja Parish, Pikevere	1993-10-03	10.5	59.0397°N 26.1064°E
Varbla Islets Nature Reserve	Varbla laidude looduskaitseala	Pärnu County, Lääneranna Parish, Kadaka	2016-09-14	10	58.4511°N 23.655°E
Vardi Nature Reserve	Vardi looduskaitseala	Rapla County, Märjamaa Parish, Vaimõisa	1978-05-22	65.8	59.0067°N 24.4597°E
Vaskjõe Nature Reserve	Vaskjõe looduskaitseala	Pärnu County, Pärnu, Seljametsa	2007-03-29	29.1	58.3331°N 24.6756°E
Veski Nature Reserve	Veski looduskaitseala	Põlva County, Kanepi Parish, Prangli	2001-11-26	6.2	58.125°N 26.7867°E
Viidumäe Nature Reserve	Viidumäe looduskaitseala	Saare County, Saaremaa Parish, Varpe	1957-07-10	261.1	58.2953°N 22.1114°E
Viieristi Nature Reserve	Viieristi looduskaitseala	Saare County, Saaremaa Parish, Lõupõllu	1965-04-02	38	58.0067°N 22.1608°E
Välgi Nature Reserve	Välgi looduskaitseala	Tartu County, Peipsiääre Parish, Alajõe	2006-05-28	7.6	58.555°N 26.9053°E
Väätsa Nature Reserve	Väätsa looduskaitseala	Järva County, Türi Parish, Röa	2005-07-13	41.8	58.9339°N 25.4786°E
Võtikvere Nature Reserve	Võtikvere looduskaitseala	Jõgeva County, Mustvee Parish, Ulvi	2005-04-20	11.7	58.8786°N 26.8228°E
Ännikse Nature Reserve	Ännikse looduskaitseala	Pärnu County, Lääneranna Parish, Koeri	2007-03-07	54	58.4694°N 23.855°E
Ülgase Nature Reserve	Ülgase looduskaitseala	Harju County, Jõelähtme Parish, Rebala	1960-06-23	5	59.4839°N 25.0933°E

== Landscape conservation areas ==
Name (English)	Name (Estonian)	Location	Founded in	Area (km^{2})	Coordinates
Aegna Landscape Conservation Area	Aegna maastikukaitseala	Harju County, Tallinn, Kesklinnaosa	1991-04-11	30.3	59.5811°N 24.7622°E
Aela Landscape Conservation Area	Aela maastikukaitseala	Rapla County, Rapla Parish, Vaopere	1981-05-24	36.6	59.0158°N 25.1906°E
Ahja River Valley Landscape Conservation Area	Ahja jõe ürgoru maastikukaitseala	Põlva County, Põlva Parish, Kiidjärve	1957-07-10	111.5	58.1297°N 27.0189°E
Ainja Landscape Conservation Area	Ainja maastikukaitseala	Viljandi County, Mulgi Parish, Ainja	1960-01-12	1.1	58.0731°N 25.6108°E
Alatskivi Landscape Conservation Area	Alatskivi maastikukaitseala	Tartu County, Peipsiääre Parish, Alatskivi	1957-07-30	38.3	58.6108°N 27.0933°E
Allikukivi Landscape Conservation Area	Allikukivi maastikukaitseala	Pärnu County, Saarde Parish, Väljaküla	2017-06-21	2.4	58.155°N 25.0081°E
Andsu Lakes Landscape Conservation Area	Andsu järvede maastikukaitseala	Võru County, Võru Parish, Puiga	1958-04-02	5.2	57.8006°N 27.0172°E
Aseri Landscape Conservation Area	Aseri maastikukaitseala	Lääne-Viru County, Viru-Nigula Parish, Kõrkküla	2007-05-08	61.1	59.4472°N 26.8633°E
Ebavere Landscape Conservation Area	Ebavere maastikukaitseala	Lääne-Viru County, Väike-Maarja Parish, Ebavere	1959-03-12	0.4	59.1033°N 26.2217°E
Emumägi Landscape Conservation Area	Emumäe maastikukaitseala	Lääne-Viru County, Väike-Maarja Parish, Salla	1959-09-09	53.9	58.9539°N 26.3667°E
Elva Landscape Conservation Area	Elva maastikukaitseala	Tartu County, Nõo Parish, Sassi	2016-03-09	10.6	58.1925°N 26.4358°E
Erumäe Landscape Conservation Area	Erumäe maastikukaitseala	Tartu County, Elva Parish, Vahessaare	2015-03-11	0.4	58.2822°N 26.3267°E
Esna Landscape Conservation Area	Esna maastikukaitseala	Järva County, Järva Parish, Esna	1965-12-28	22.6	58.9814°N 25.7781°E
Hiiumaa Islets Landscape Conservation Area	Hiiumaa laidude maastikukaitseala	Hiiu County, Hiiumaa Parish, Salinõmme	1958-05-27	322.4	58.79°N 23.0564°E
Haanja Landscape Conservation Area	Haanja looduspark	Võru County, Rõuge Parish, Vadsa	1957-07-10	1704	57.7264°N 27.0347°E
Hino Landscape Conservation Area	Hino maastikukaitseala	Võru County, Rõuge Parish, Siksälä	2005-08-10	70.1	57.5828°N 27.2031°E
Iganõmme Landscape Conservation Area	Iganõmme maastikukaitseala	Rapla County, Märjamaa Parish, Laukna	1960-09-13	0.5	58.9294°N 24.185°E
Jalase Landscape Conservation Area	Jalase maastikukaitseala	Rapla County, Rapla Parish, Koikse	1937-12-02	272.8	58.9783°N 24.5969°E
Järve Dunes Landscape Conservation Area	Järve luidete maastikukaitseala	Saare County, Saaremaa Parish, Järve	1959-05-18	9.6	58.1964°N 22.2858°E
Järvevälja Landscape Conservation Area	Järvevälja maastikukaitseala	Ida-Viru County, Alutaguse Parish, Rannapungerja	1967-01-16	31	58.9811°N 27.1547°E
Järveotsa Landscape Conservation Area	Järveotsa maastikukaitseala	Pärnu County, Saarde Parish, Jäärja	1991-07-11	2.7	58.0467°N 24.9875°E
Jõuga Landscape Conservation Area	Jõuga maastikukaitseala	Ida-Viru County, Alutaguse Parish, Ongassaare	2017-08-30	30.4	59.1653°N 27.4272°E
Kaali Landscape Conservation Area	Kaali maastikukaitseala	Saare County, Saaremaa Parish, Kõljala	1938-08-18	3.9	58.3694°N 22.6703°E
Kallukse Landscape Conservation Area	Kallukse maastikukaitseala	Lääne-Viru County, Kadrina Parish, Hõbeda	1978-12-10	23.3	59.3578°N 26.0725°E
Kanahaua Landscape Conservation Area	Kanahaua maastikukaitseala	Tartu County, Elva Parish, Metsalaane	2015-01-14	0.5	58.2494°N 26.4081°E
Karksi Landscape Conservation Area	Karksi maastikukaitseala	Viljandi County, Mulgi Parish, Ainja	2016-03-09	21	58.1056°N 25.5628°E
Karula Pikkjärve Landscape Conservation Area	Karula Pikkjärve maastikukaitseala	Valga County, Valga Parish, Karula	1959-12-10	36.4	57.7706°N 26.3131°E
Kastna Landscape Conservation Area	Kastna maastikukaitseala	Pärnu County, Pärnu, Ranniku	2007-03-29	12.3	58.3231°N 23.905°E
Kasti Landscape Conservation Area	Kasti maastikukaitseala	Saare County, Saaremaa Parish, Kasti	2000-07-26	19.4	58.2492°N 22.6422°E
Kaugatoma-Lõu Landscape Conservation Area	Kaugatoma-Lõu maastikukaitseala	Saare County, Saaremaa Parish, Anseküla	1973-12-17	6	58.1072°N 22.1922°E
Kellavere Landscape Conservation Area	Kellavere maastikukaitseala	Lääne-Viru County, Vinni Parish, Moora	1959-09-09	15.5	59.0789°N 26.5136°E
Kesselaiu Landscape Conservation Area	Kesselaiu maastikukaitseala	Saare County, Muhu Parish, Kesse	1938-11-09	17.5	58.6325°N 23.4292°E
Kiigumõisa Landscape Conservation Area	Kiigumõisa maastikukaitseala	Järva County, Järva Parish, Kaalepi	1981-01-25	1.7	59.0517°N 25.6556°E
Kisejärve Landscape Conservation Area	Kisejärve maastikukaitseala	Võru County, Rõuge Parish, Kärinä	1983-03-15	66.9	57.6294°N 27.1894°E
Kirikumäe Landscape Conservation Area	Kirikumäe maastikukaitseala	Võru County, Võru Parish, Heinasoo	1970-11-11	36.2	57.6817°N 27.2511°E
Kivikupitsa Landscape Conservation Area	Kivikupitsa maastikukaitseala	Pärnu County, Häädemeeste Parish, Orajõe	1960-03-24	13.6	57.9286°N 24.4619°E
Koigi Landscape Conservation Area	Koigi maastikukaitseala	Saare County, Saaremaa Parish, Are	2005-08-17	237.1	58.4919°N 22.9636°E
Koiva-Mustjõe Landscape Conservation Area	Koiva-Mustjõe maastikukaitseala	Võru County, Rõuge Parish, Hüti	1957-07-10	319.6	57.6392°N 26.3892°E
Kolga Bay Landscape Conservation Area	Kolga lahe maastikukaitseala	Harju County, Jõelähtme Parish, Rammu	1938-11-09	193.3	59.5686°N 25.2883°E
Kosemäe Landscape Conservation Area	Kosemäe maastikukaitseala	Pärnu County, Saarde Parish, Kanaküla	2016-12-08	4.7	58.2483°N 25.1489°E
Kostivere Landscape Conservation Area	Kostivere maastikukaitseala	Harju County, Jõelähtme Parish, Kostivere	1959-03-12	11.2	59.4356°N 25.115°E
Kuimetsa Landscape Conservation Area	Kuimetsa maastikukaitseala	Rapla County, Rapla Parish, Vaopere	1959-03-12	4.6	59.0556°N 25.1456°E
Kullamäe Landscape Conservation Area	Kullamäe maastikukaitseala	Viljandi County, Viljandi Parish, Jakobimõisa	1964-01-16	0.5	58.2183°N 25.8764°E
Kurese Landscape Conservation Area	Kurese maastikukaitseala	Pärnu County, Lääneranna Parish, Emmu	1976-09-26	52.5	58.6414°N 24.1303°E
Kurtna Landscape Conservation Area	Kurtna maastikukaitseala	Ida-Viru County, Alutaguse Parish, Vasavere	1987-06-07	282	59.2681°N 27.5683°E
Käina Bay-Kassari Landscape Conservation Area	Käina lahe-Kassari maastikukaitseala	Hiiu County, Hiiumaa Parish, Jõeküla	1961-09-19	568.1	58.8006°N 22.8325°E
Kuulmajärve Landscape Conservation Area	Kuulmajärve maastikukaitseala	Põlva County, Räpina Parish, Viira	1983-03-27	101.6	57.9725°N 27.1544°E
Kääpa Landscape Conservation Area	Kääpa maastikukaitseala	Tartu County, Peipsiääre Parish, Välgi	1961-06-27	229.6	58.6247°N 26.8506°E
Kõnnumaa Landscape Conservation Area	Kõnnumaa maastikukaitseala	Rapla County, Rapla Parish, Vana-Kaiu	1961-06-01	574.4	58.9206°N 25.0342°E
Kõrvemaa Landscape Conservation Area	Kõrvemaa maastikukaitseala	Lääne-Viru County, Tapa Parish, Raudla	1959-04-05	2065.3	59.1436°N 25.5514°E
Kübassaare Landscape Conservation Area	Kübassaare maastikukaitseala	Saare County, Saaremaa Parish, Kakuna	1973-12-17	51.7	58.4411°N 23.2983°E
Kalli Landscape Conservation Area	Kalli maastikukaitseala	Saare County, Saaremaa Parish, Tõnija	2007-05-08	48	58.3892°N 22.9061°E
Laulasmaa Landscape Conservation Area	Laulasmaa maastikukaitseala	Harju County, Lääne-Harju Parish, Laulasmaa	2005-07-06	13.1	59.3828°N 24.2494°E
Letipea Landscape Conservation Area	Letipea maastikukaitseala	Lääne-Viru County, Viru-Nigula Parish, Letipea	1992-01-29	60.9	59.5428°N 26.5794°E
Lihula Landscape Conservation Area	Lihula maastikukaitseala	Pärnu County, Lääneranna Parish, Sookatse	1998-09-24	665.4	58.6569°N 23.9492°E
Lindmetsa Landscape Conservation Area	Lindmetsa maastikukaitseala	Saare County, Saaremaa Parish, Kaunispe	2007-03-29	5.1	58.0511°N 22.0725°E
Loodi Landscape Conservation Area	Loodi looduspark	Viljandi County, Viljandi Parish, Luiga	1992-11-08	34.9	58.2897°N 25.6142°E
Luidja Landscape Conservation Area	Luidja maastikukaitseala	Hiiu County, Hiiumaa Parish, Paope	1958-05-27	6.8	58.9397°N 22.4053°E
Luhasoo Landscape Conservation Area	Luhasoo maastikukaitseala	Võru County, Rõuge Parish, Luutsniku	1981-05-24	80.3	57.6453°N 26.9067°E
Läänemaa Suursoo Landscape Conservation Area	Läänemaa Suursoo maastikukaitseala	Lääne County, Lääne-Nigula Parish, Kuijõe	1959-06-09	1030.4	59.1253°N 23.8603°E
Lüsingu Landscape Conservation Area	Lüsingu maastikukaitseala	Järva County, Järva Parish, Reinevere	2006-10-12	10.9	59.1636°N 25.8947°E
Lümandu Landscape Conservation Area	Lümandu maastikukaitseala	Rapla County, Kohila Parish, Lümandu	1981-11-23	10.7	59.1714°N 24.5706°E
Manija Landscape Conservation Area	Manija maastikukaitseala	Pärnu County, Pärnu, Manija	1991-07-11	20.5	58.2183°N 24.1228°E
Mukri Landscape Conservation Area	Mukri maastikukaitseala	Rapla County, Kehtna Parish, Ellamaa	1992-10-19	215.8	58.7386°N 24.9958°E
Mustoja Landscape Conservation Area	Mustoja maastikukaitseala	Võru County, Setomaa Parish, Sesniki	1998-10-26	348.8	57.8883°N 27.6564°E
Muti Landscape Conservation Area	Muti maastikukaitseala	Viljandi County, Mulgi Parish, Hirmuküla	1990-08-20	15.9	58.1342°N 25.6831°E
Mädapea Oak-forest Landscape Conservation Area	Mädapea tammiku maastikukaitseala	Lääne-Viru County, Kadrina Parish, Saukse	1958-11-26	7.2	59.3222°N 26.2603°E
Mäetaguse Landscape Conservation Area	Mäetaguse maastikukaitseala	Ida-Viru County, Alutaguse Parish, Mäetaguse	1965-11-23	5.3	59.2244°N 27.3217°E
Märjamaa Landscape Conservation Area	Märjamaa järtade maastikukaitseala	Rapla County, Märjamaa Parish, Kõrtsuotsa	1981-11-23	10.6	58.9019°N 24.46°E
Mõdriku-Roela Landscape Conservation Area	Mõdriku-Roela maastikukaitseala	Lääne-Viru County, Vinni Parish, Kehala	1958-11-26	163	59.2397°N 26.5247°E
Naage Landscape Conservation Area	Naage maastikukaitseala	Harju County, Harku Parish, Naage	2005-07-20	0.5	59.4072°N 24.3583°E
Naissaare Landscape Conservation Area	Naissaare looduspark	Harju County, Viimsi Parish, Tagaküla	1995-03-30	189.3	59.5711°N 24.5197°E
Narva River Landscape Conservation Area	Narva jõe kanjoni maastikukaitseala	Ida-Viru County, Narva	1959-03-12	0.1	59.3569°N 28.1953°E
Navesti Landscape Conservation Area	Navesti maastikukaitseala	Viljandi County, Põhja-Sakala Parish, Kootsi	1992-11-08	16.9	58.5922°N 25.3414°E
Neeruti Landscape Conservation Area	Neeruti maastikukaitseala	Lääne-Viru County, Tapa Parish, Piisupi	1957-07-10	125	59.2936°N 26.1347°E
Niidu Landscape Conservation Area	Niidu maastikukaitseala	Pärnu County, Pärnu, Pärnu vallasisene	1958-09-11	8.5	58.3817°N 24.5486°E
Odalätsi Landscape Conservation Area	Odalätsi maastikukaitseala	Saare County, Saaremaa Parish, Kuremetsa	1959-05-18	16.4	58.3931°N 22.1133°E
Nõmme-Mustamäe Landscape Conservation Area	Nõmme-Mustamäe maastikukaitseala	Harju County, Tallinn, Mustamäe	2004-04-29	20.1	59.39°N 24.6633°E
Ohessaare Landscape Conservation Area	Ohessaare maastikukaitseala	Saare County, Saaremaa Parish, Ohessaare	1959-03-12	0.6	57.9978°N 22.0217°E
Ontika Landscape Conservation Area	Ontika maastikukaitseala	Ida-Viru County, Toila Parish, Altküla	1939-05-18	133.8	59.4303°N 27.3369°E
Oru Park Landscape Conservation Area	Oru pargi maastikukaitseala	Ida-Viru County, Toila Parish, Pühajõe	1936-05-21	7.5	59.4228°N 27.53°E
Osmussaar Landscape Conservation Area	Osmussaare maastikukaitseala	Lääne County, Lääne-Nigula Parish, Osmussaare	1996-03-13	48.9	59.2886°N 23.3933°E
Otepää Landscape Conservation Area	Otepää looduspark	Valga County, Otepää Parish, Neeruti	1957-07-10	2220.9	58.0447°N 26.4261°E
Padaoru Landscape Conservation Area	Padaoru maastikukaitseala	Lääne-Viru County, Viru-Nigula Parish, Metsavälja	1959-09-30	17.8	59.4233°N 26.7011°E
Pae Landscape Conservation Area	Pae maastikukaitseala	Rapla County, Kehtna Parish, Pae	1959-03-12	3.3	58.9969°N 24.9153°E
Paganamaa Landscape Conservation Area	Paganamaa maastikukaitseala	Võru County, Rõuge Parish, Liguri	1962-03-29	103	57.5847°N 26.7733°E
Pajaka Landscape Conservation Area	Pajaka maastikukaitseala	Rapla County, Märjamaa Parish, Hiietse	1958-05-26	20.2	59.0467°N 24.4003°E
Pakri Landscape Conservation Area	Pakri maastikukaitseala	Harju County, Lääne-Harju Parish, Paldiski vallasisene	1998-05-04	146	59.3508°N 24.02°E
Pamma Landscape Conservation Area	Pamma maastikukaitseala	Saare County, Saaremaa Parish, Pamma	2018-06-20	0.8	58.5061°N 22.5747°E
Panga Landscape Conservation Area	Panga maastikukaitseala	Saare County, Saaremaa Parish, Panga	1959-03-12	2.7	58.5608°N 22.2925°E
Pangodi Landscape Conservation Area	Pangodi maastikukaitseala	Tartu County, Kambja Parish, Kodijärve	1957-07-09	38.3	58.19°N 26.5631°E
Papioru Landscape Conservation Area	Papioru maastikukaitseala	Viljandi County, Põhja-Sakala Parish, Jaska	1964-01-16	0.4	58.5597°N 25.5564°E
Paunküla Landscape Conservation Area	Paunküla maastikukaitseala	Harju County, Kose Parish, Rõõsa	1958-10-01	62.3	59.1411°N 25.2775°E
Peetri River Landscape Conservation Area	Peetri jõe maastikukaitseala	Võru County, Rõuge Parish, Karisöödi	1959-03-12	50	57.5572°N 26.555°E
Piiumetsa Landscape Conservation Area	Piiumetsa maastikukaitseala	Järva County, Türi Parish, Lungu	1981-05-24	113.6	58.8997°N 25.2533°E
Pilkuse Landscape Conservation Area	Pilkuse maastikukaitseala	Rapla County, Märjamaa Parish, Vana-Vigala	1992-10-19	48	58.7997°N 24.255°E
Pirita River Valley Landscape Conservation Area	Pirita jõeoru maastikukaitseala	Harju County, Jõelähtme Parish, Iru	1957-07-10	70.7	59.465°N 24.8731°E
Piusa River Valley Landscape Conservation Area	Piusa jõe ürgoru maastikukaitseala	Võru County, Võru Parish, Plessi	1962-03-29	121.2	57.7742°N 27.3583°E
Porkuni Landscape Conservation Area	Porkuni maastikukaitseala	Lääne-Viru County, Rakvere Parish, Levala	1959-09-09	115.2	59.2114°N 26.22°E
Prangli Landscape Conservation Area	Prangli maastikukaitseala	Harju County, Viimsi Parish, Idaotsa	1960-06-23	13.5	59.6053°N 25.0622°E
Päite Landscape Conservation Area	Päite maastikukaitseala	Ida-Viru County, Toila Parish, Päite	2005-07-20	12.9	59.4158°N 27.6225°E
Pärnu Landscape Conservation Area	Pärnu maastikukaitseala	Pärnu County, Häädemeeste Parish, Reiu	1958-09-11	51.9	58.3317°N 24.5939°E
Rabivere Landscape Conservation Area	Rabivere maastikukaitseala	Rapla County, Kohila Parish, Mälivere	1981-11-23	216.9	59.1108°N 24.7097°E
Raikküla-Pakamäe Landscape Conservation Area	Raikküla-Pakamäe maastikukaitseala	Rapla County, Rapla Parish, Raela	1973-09-24	2	58.9419°N 24.7478°E
Rakvere Oak-forest Landscape Conservation Area	Rakvere tammiku maastikukaitseala	Lääne-Viru County, Rakvere	1939-01-26	2.5	59.3367°N 26.3511°E
Rannamõisa Landscape Conservation Area	Rannamõisa maastikukaitseala	Harju County, Harku Parish, Tabasalu	1959-03-12	6.7	59.4408°N 24.5222°E
Rannaniidi Cliffs Landscape Conservation Area	Rannaniidi pankade maastikukaitseala	Saare County, Muhu Parish, Lõetsa	1959-03-12	9.8	58.6422°N 23.3411°E
Rava Landscape Conservation Area	Rava maastikukaitseala	Järva County, Järva Parish, Rava	1936-05-10	1.6	59.1247°N 25.8508°E
Roosna-Alliku Landscape Conservation Area	Roosna-Alliku maastikukaitseala	Järva County, Paide, Allikjärve	2005-08-10	0.4	59.0275°N 25.6994°E
Rutu Landscape Conservation Area	Rutu maastikukaitseala	Viljandi County, Mulgi Parish, Ainja	1990-08-20	32.9	58.0439°N 25.6589°E
Saarjärve Landscape Conservation Area	Saarjärve looduspark	Jõgeva County, Mustvee Parish, Saarjärve	1968-07-16	15.9	58.6547°N 26.7608°E
Saarjõe Landscape Conservation Area	Saarjõe maastikukaitseala	Viljandi County, Põhja-Sakala Parish, Kootsi	2006-08-16	175.9	58.6144°N 25.3025°E
Salajõe Landscape Conservation Area	Salajõe maastikukaitseala	Lääne County, Lääne-Nigula Parish, Vedra	1959-06-09	1.6	59.0219°N 23.6678°E
Saunaküla Landscape Conservation Area	Saunaküla maastikukaitseala	Rapla County, Kohila Parish, Vilivere	2018-03-28	2.6	59.1867°N 24.6914°E
Sarve Landscape Conservation Area	Sarve maastikukaitseala	Hiiu County, Hiiumaa Parish, Sarve	1973-07-29	81	58.8456°N 23.0231°E
Selja River Landscape Conservation Area	Selja jõe maastikukaitseala	Lääne-Viru County, Haljala Parish, Rutja	1978-12-10	64.3	59.5108°N 26.3603°E
Siimusti-Kurista Landscape Conservation Area	Siimusti-Kurista maastikukaitseala	Jõgeva County, Jõgeva Parish, Kurista	2014-06-18	0.6	58.7442°N 26.3178°E
Sepaste Landscape Conservation Area	Sepaste maastikukaitseala	Hiiu County, Hiiumaa Parish, Sepaste	1998-07-27	3.7	58.72°N 22.5189°E
Smolnitsa Landscape Conservation Area	Smolnitsa maastikukaitseala	Ida-Viru County, Alutaguse Parish, Smolnitsa	1967-01-16	24.2	59.0028°N 27.6592°E
Struuga Landscape Conservation Area	Struuga maastikukaitseala	Ida-Viru County, Alutaguse Parish, Jaama	2007-05-08	125.1	59.0311°N 27.7289°E
Sämi Landscape Conservation Area	Sämi maastikukaitseala	Lääne-Viru County, Viru-Nigula Parish, Samma	1981-05-24	94.6	59.3933°N 26.6617°E
Tareste Landscape Conservation Area	Tareste maastikukaitseala	Hiiu County, Hiiumaa Parish, Tareste	2007-05-17	45.5	59.0178°N 22.7081°E
Teringi Landscape Conservation Area	Teringi maastikukaitseala	Viljandi County, Mulgi Parish, Lilli	1999-10-07	32.2	57.9758°N 25.5528°E
Tikste Landscape Conservation Area	Tikste maastikukaitseala	Valga County, Tõrva Parish, Kirikuküla	1964-06-04	3.8	57.9989°N 25.9019°E
Tilga Landscape Conservation Area	Tilga maastikukaitseala	Hiiu County, Hiiumaa Parish, Prassi	1998-09-24	4	58.715°N 22.6144°E
Tilleoru Landscape Conservation Area	Tilleoru maastikukaitseala	Põlva County, Põlva Parish, Puskaru	2014-05-08	14.6	58.0253°N 26.9261°E
Tõstamaa Landscape Conservation Area	Tõstamaa maastikukaitseala	Pärnu County, Pärnu, Liu	1976-09-26	128.8	58.2842°N 24.0953°E
Türisalu Landscape Conservation Area	Türisalu maastikukaitseala	Harju County, Harku Parish, Vääna-Jõesuu	1991-12-17	9.7	59.4117°N 24.3086°E
Türi Landscape Conservation Area	Türi maastikukaitseala	Järva County, Türi Parish, Näsuvere	2010-11-25	35.8	58.8444°N 25.4742°E
Ubari Landscape Conservation Area	Ubari maastikukaitseala	Harju County, Jõelähtme Parish, Kaberneeme	2005-06-15	5.9	59.49°N 25.2964°E
Udria Landscape Conservation Area	Udria maastikukaitseala	Ida-Viru County, Narva-Jõesuu, Udria	1939-10-05	37.7	59.3911°N 27.9192°E
Uhaku Landscape Conservation Area	Uhaku maastikukaitseala	Ida-Viru County, Lüganuse Parish, Lüganuse	2013-11-10	3.3	59.3728°N 27.0178°E
Ura Landscape Conservation Area	Ura maastikukaitseala	Pärnu County, Lääneranna Parish, Iska	2007-05-07	31.1	58.5872°N 24.2019°E
Uljaste Landscape Conservation Area	Uljaste maastikukaitseala	Lääne-Viru County, Vinni Parish, Viru-Kabala	2017-03-30	63.8	59.3661°N 26.7517°E
Uue-Võidu Landscape Conservation Area	Uue-Võidu maastikukaitseala	Viljandi County, Viljandi Parish, Aindu	1964-01-16	5.2	58.3961°N 25.6025°E
Uulu-Võiste Landscape Conservation Area	Uulu-Võiste maastikukaitseala	Pärnu County, Häädemeeste Parish, Leina	2016-12-28	68.8	58.2517°N 24.5444°E
Vahtrepa Landscape Conservation Area	Vahtrepa maastikukaitseala	Hiiu County, Hiiumaa Parish, Hagaste	1958-05-27	139.5	58.9153°N 22.9978°E
Vaivara Landscape Conservation Area	Vaivara maastikukaitseala	Ida-Viru County, Narva-Jõesuu, Sinimäe	1959-03-12	8	59.3461°N 27.8058°E
Valgejärve Landscape Conservation Area	Valgejärve maastikukaitseala	Harju County, Saue Parish, Siimika	1981-12-28	72.3	59.1122°N 24.1314°E
Varesemägede Landscape Conservation Area	Varesemägede maastikukaitseala	Viljandi County, Viljandi Parish, Taari	1964-01-16	2.4	58.4111°N 25.6864°E
Verijärve Landscape Conservation Area	Verijärve maastikukaitseala	Võru County, Võru Parish, Verijärve	1958-04-02	8.1	57.8083°N 27.0544°E
Viitna Landscape Conservation Area	Viitna maastikukaitseala	Lääne-Viru County, Kadrina Parish, Jürimõisa	1971-05-31	31.5	59.4425°N 26.0094°E
Viljandi Landscape Conservation Area	Viljandi maastikukaitseala	Viljandi County, Viljandi Parish, Vardja	1964-01-16	36.7	58.3464°N 25.6019°E
Vinni-Pajusti Landscape Conservation Area	Vinni-Pajusti maastikukaitseala	Lääne-Viru County, Vinni Parish, Kehala	1958-11-26	9.3	59.2908°N 26.4303°E
Vooremaa Landscape Conservation Area	Vooremaa maastikukaitseala	Tartu County, Tartu Parish, Kukulinna	1964-02-03	988.2	58.5844°N 26.65°E
Väike-Palkna Landscape Conservation Area	Väike-Palkna maastikukaitseala	Võru County, Rõuge Parish, Pillardi	1979-09-23	2.5	57.6086°N 26.9694°E
Vulbi Landscape Conservation Area	Vulbi maastikukaitseala	Järva County, Järva Parish, Peedu	1993-10-06	0.1	59.1844°N 25.6897°E
Vormsi Landscape Conservation Area	Vormsi maastikukaitseala	Lääne County, Vormsi Parish, Söderby	1939-05-18	242.3	58.9936°N 23.2522°E
Vääna Landscape Conservation Area	Vääna maastikukaitseala	Harju County, Harku Parish, Humala	1991-12-17	40.9	59.3839°N 24.3811°E
Õisu Landscape Conservation Area	Õisu maastikukaitseala	Viljandi County, Mulgi Parish, Morna	1959-06-04	59.6	58.1958°N 25.5353°E
Äntu Landscape Conservation Area	Äntu maastikukaitseala	Lääne-Viru County, Väike-Maarja Parish, Kärsa	1978-12-10	3.9	59.0519°N 26.2439°E
Üügu Landscape Conservation Area	Üügu maastikukaitseala	Saare County, Muhu Parish, Kallaste	1959-03-12	1	58.6717°N 23.24°E

== See also ==
- Protected areas of Estonia
- List of Ramsar sites in Estonia
- Estonian Nature Fund
- Category:Nature conservation in Estonia

== Notes ==
1. Link leads to the protected area page in the Estonian Environmental Registry (in Estonian)
2. Larger areas may extend into the neighboring parishes and counties
