= Padaorg Landscape Conservation Area =

Protected area in Estonia

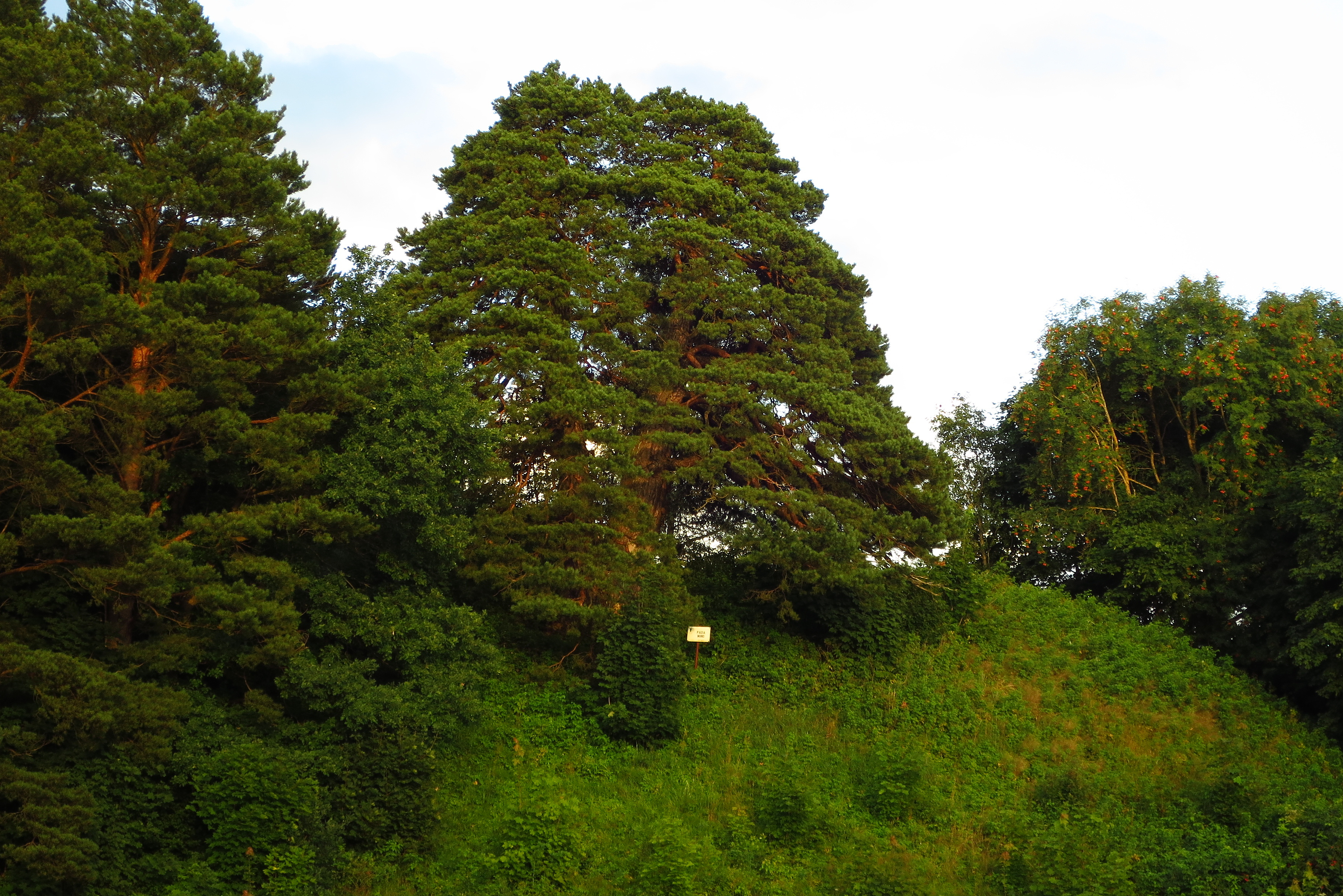

- Location within Estonia
- Location: Estonia
- Coordinates: 59°25′N 26°42′E
- Area: 178 ha (440 acres)
- Established: 1978 (2005)

Padaorg Landscape Conservation Area (Estonian: Padaoru maastikukaitseala) is a nature park in Lääne-Viru County, Estonia.

The area of the nature park is 178 ha.

The protected area was founded in 1978 to protect Pada Valley and its surrounding areas. In 2005, the protected area was designated to the landscape conservation area.
