= Kabli Nature Reserve =

Protected area in Estonia

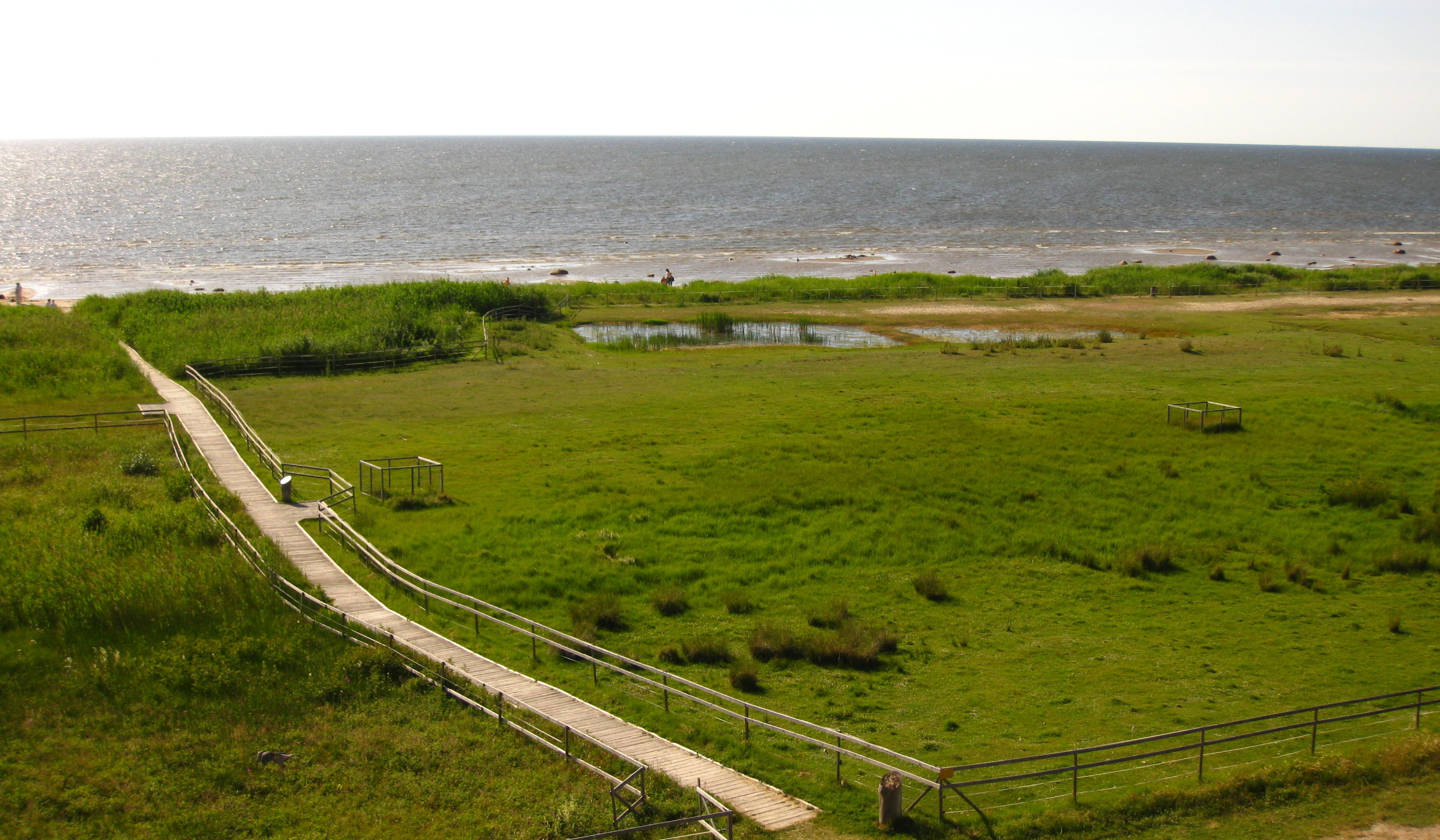

- Location within Estonia
- Location: Estonia
- Nearest city: Pärnu
- Coordinates: 58°01′09″N 24°27′03″E
- Area: 733 ha (1,810 acres)
- Established: 1991

Kabli Nature Reserve is a nature reserve situated in south-western Estonia, in Pärnu County.

A birdwatching tower was built here in 1969, and the area was designated a protected area in 1991. In 2007, the area was granted a higher degree of protection. The rich bird-life continues to be the main reason for these protective measures, as the coastal waters and fragile water meadows lining the Gulf of Riga here is an important stopover for migratory birds. Between 10,000 and 20,000 birds are ringed here every season. In addition, migratory bats and insects have been studied in the nature reserve.

A visitors' centre offers exhibitions and information about the wildlife in the nature reserve, and is supplemented by nature trails, bird watching towers and other facilities.

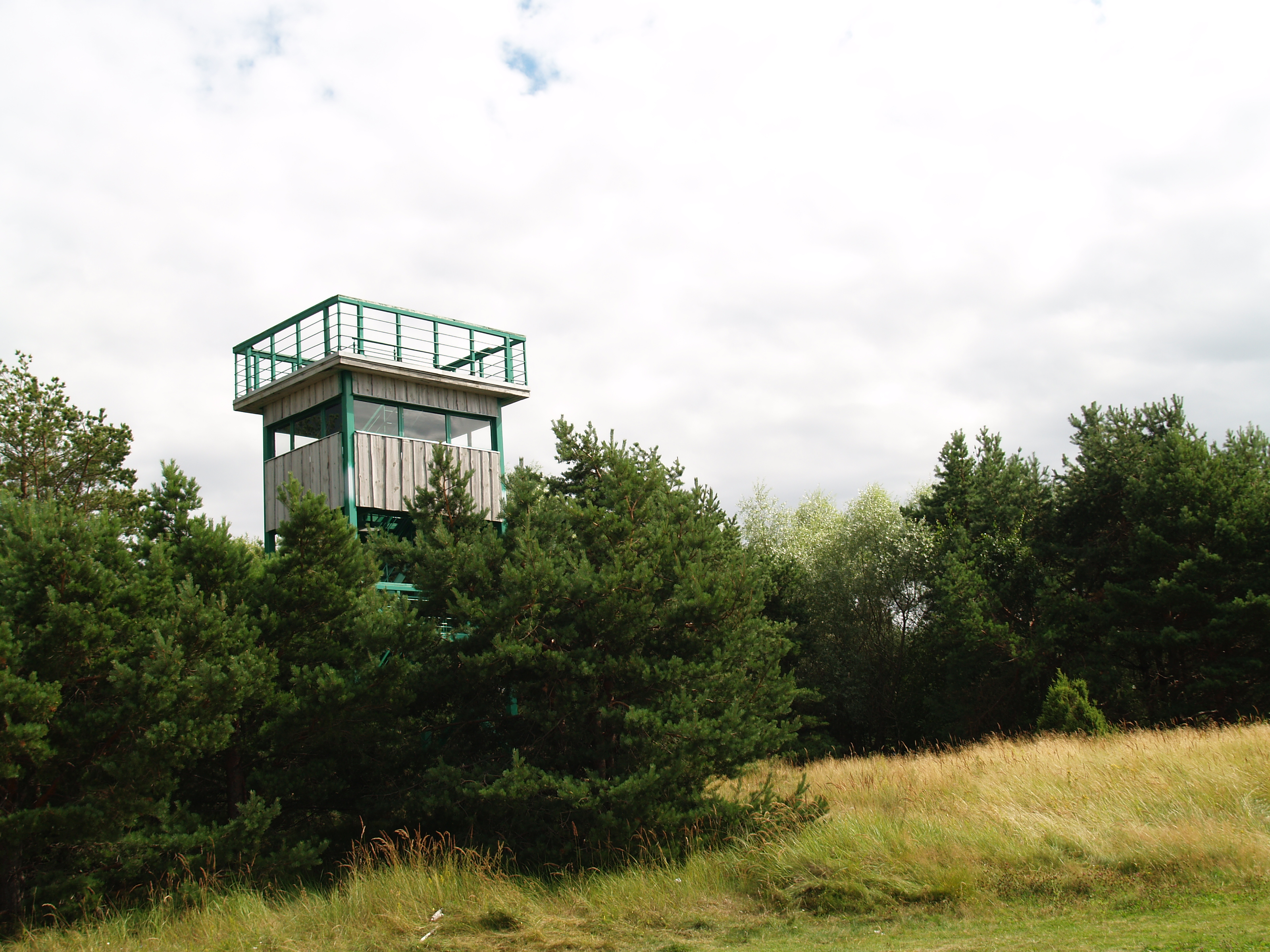

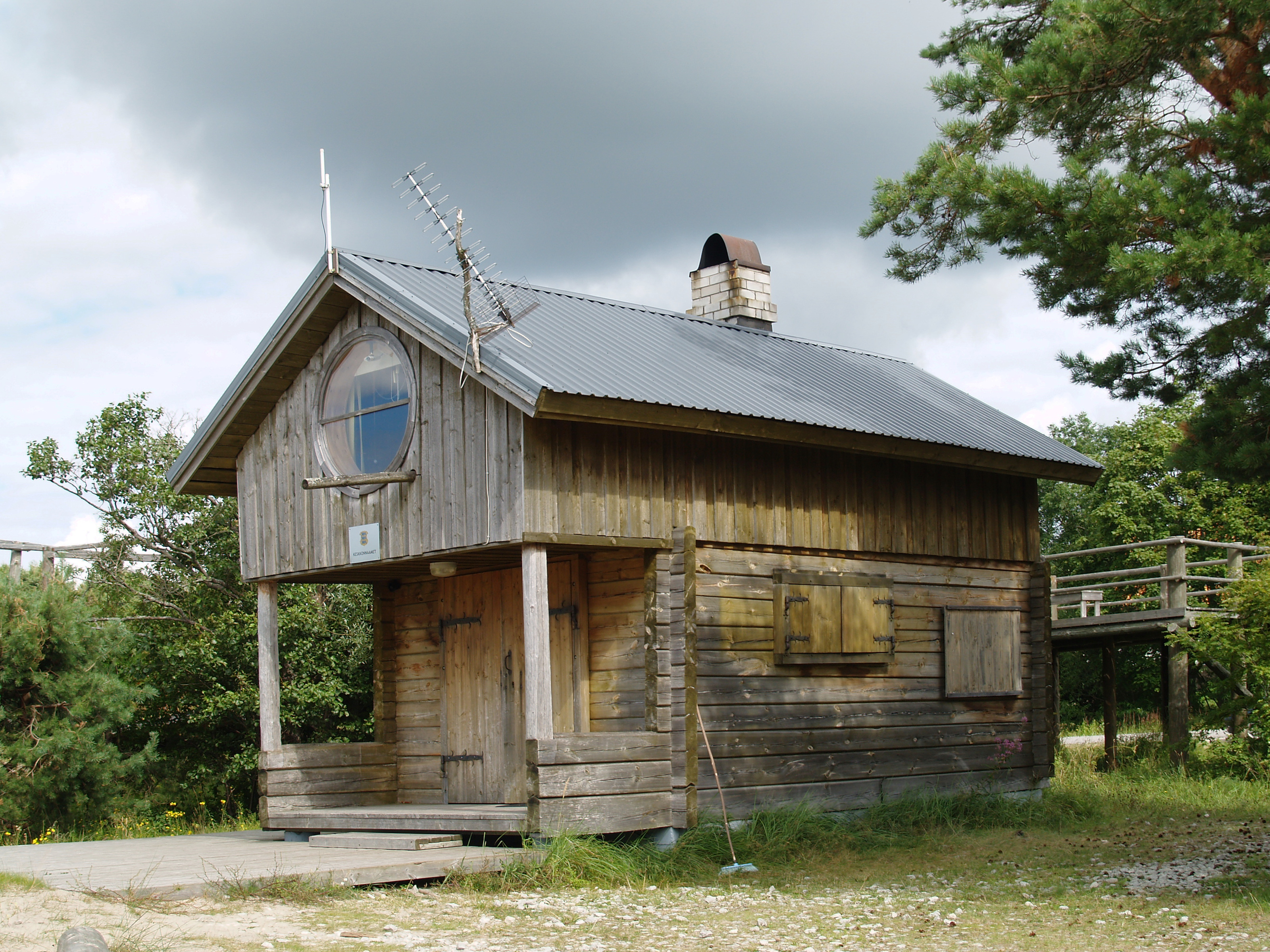

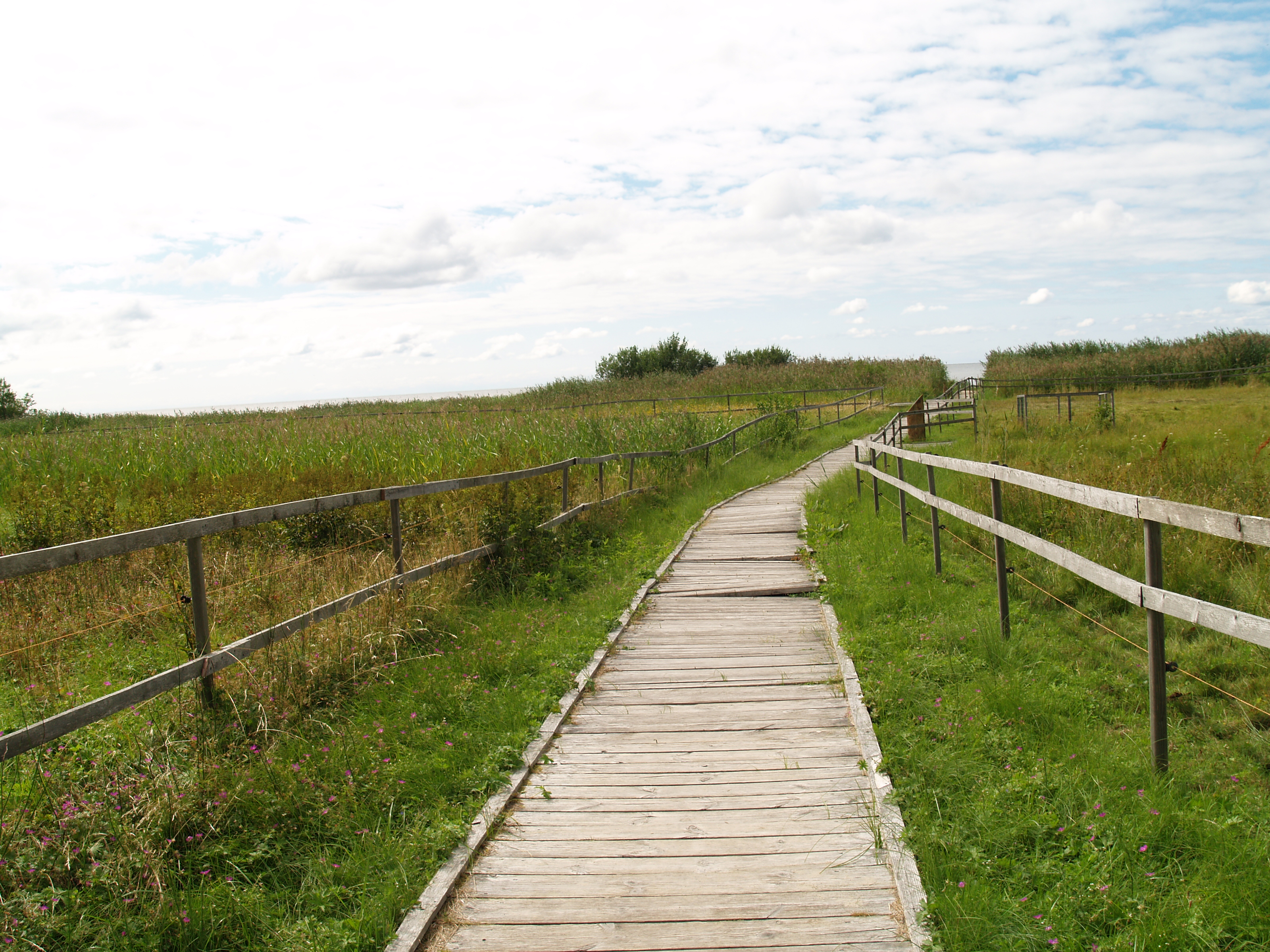
