= Nabala-Tuhala Nature Reserve =

Protected area in Estonia

- Location within Estonia
- Location: Estonia
- Coordinates: 59°13′N 24°51′E
- Area: 4,629 ha (11,440 acres)
- Established: 1998 (2014)

Nabala-Tuhala Nature Reserve is a nature reserve which is located in Rapla County, Estonia.

The area of the nature reserve is 4629 ha.

The protected area was founded in 1998 on the basis of former Tuhala Landscape Conservation Area and Alema Nature Reserve.
