= Pae Landscape Conservation Area =

Protected area in Estonia

- Location within Estonia
- Location: Estonia
- Coordinates: 58°59′50″N 24°55′00″E
- Area: 33 ha (82 acres)
- Established: 1959 (2006)

Pae Landscape Conservation Area is a nature park which is located in Rapla County, Estonia.

The area of the nature park is 33 ha.

The protected area was founded in 1959 to protect Pae Karst Area. In 2006, the protected area was designated to the landscape conservation area.
