= Muti Landscape Conservation Area =

Protected area in Estonia

- Location within Estonia
- Location: Estonia
- Coordinates: 58°09′00″N 25°40′40″E
- Area: 159 ha (390 acres)
- Established: 1990 (2014)

Muti Landscape Conservation Area is a nature park is located in Viljandi County, Estonia.

The area of the nature park is 159 ha.

The protected area was founded in 1990 to protect Muti lakes (Muti Lake and Muti Umbjärv) and theirs surrounding areas. In 1998, the protected area was designated to the landscape conservation area.
