= Prandi Nature Reserve =

Protected area in Estonia

- Location within Estonia
- Location: Estonia
- Coordinates: 58°50′N 25°39′E
- Area: 876 ha (2,160 acres)
- Established: 1981 (2006)

Prandi Nature Reserve is a nature reserve which is located in Järva County, Estonia.

The area of the nature reserve is 876 ha.

The protected area was founded in 1981 to protect Prandi Springs. In 2006 the protected area was designated to the nature reserve.
