= Kullamäe Landscape Conservation Area =

Protected area in Estonia

- Location within Estonia
- Location: Estonia
- Coordinates: 58°13′08″N 25°52′35″E
- Area: 5 ha (12 acres)
- Established: 1964 (2009)

Kullamäe Landscape Conservation Area is a nature park situated in Viljandi County, Estonia.

Its area is 5 ha.

The protected area was designated in 1964 to protect Kullamäe Outcrop (:et) and its surrounding areas. In 1998, the protected area was redesigned to the landscape conservation area.
