= Türi Landscape Conservation Area =

Protected area in Estonia

- Location within Estonia
- Location: Estonia
- Coordinates: 58°51′N 25°28′E
- Area: 3,575 ha (8,830 acres)
- Established: (1992) 2010

Türi Landscape Conservation Area is a nature park which is located in Järva County, Estonia.

The area of the nature park is 3575 ha.

The protected area was founded in 2010 to protect Türi Kame Field (Estonian: Türi voorestik) and its surrounding areas.
