= Varbla Islets Nature Reserve =

Protected area in Estonia

- Location within Estonia
- Location: Estonia
- Coordinates: 58°27′30″N 23°39′00″E
- Area: 997 ha (2,460 acres)
- Established: 1976 (2016)

Varbla Islets Nature Reserve is a nature reserve which is located in Pärnu County, Estonia.

The area of the nature reserve is 997 ha.

The protected area was founded in 1976 to protect animals on Kuralaid, Pihelgalaid, Rangilaid, Põntsilaid, Kitselaid, Kändmelaid, Orikalaid, Piiukaaselaid, Selilaid and Pööriotsalaid. In 1991, the protected area was designated to the Varbla Islets protection area. In 2007, the protected area was designated to the Varbla Islets Landscape Conservationa Area, and in 2017 the protected was designated to Varbla Islets Nature Reserve.
