= Lasila Nature Reserve =

Protected area in Estonia

- Location within Estonia
- Location: Estonia
- Coordinates: 59°15′N 26°12′E
- Area: 315 hectares (780 acres)
- Established: 2005 (2016)

Lasila Nature Reserve is a nature reserve which is located in Lääne-Viru County, Estonia.

The area of the nature reserve is 315 hectares (780 acres).

The protected area was founded in 2005 on the basis of Lasila Protected Area (Estonian: Lasila hoiuala).
