= Järveotsa Landscape Conservation Area =

Protected area in Estonia

- Location within Estonia
- Location: Estonia
- Coordinates: 58°02′50″N 24°59′10″E
- Area: 27 ha (67 acres)
- Established: 1991 (2007)

Järveotsa Landscape Conservation Area is a nature park situated in Pärnu County, Estonia.

Its area is 27 ha.

The protected area was designated in 1991 to protect Järveotsa oaks. In 2007, the protected area was redesigned to the landscape conservation area.
