= Kõnnumaa Landscape Conservation Area =

Protected area in Estonia

- Location within Estonia
- Location: Estonia
- Coordinates: 58°56′N 25°01′E
- Area: 5,744 ha (14,190 acres)
- Established: 1981 (2019)

Kõnnumaa Landscape Conservation Area is a nature park situated in Rapla County, Estonia.

Its area is 5744 ha.

The protected area was designated in 1981 to protect Keava, Palasi and Loosalu Bog. In 2000, the protected area was redesigned to the landscape conservation area.
