= Tuhu Nature Reserve =

Protected area in Estonia

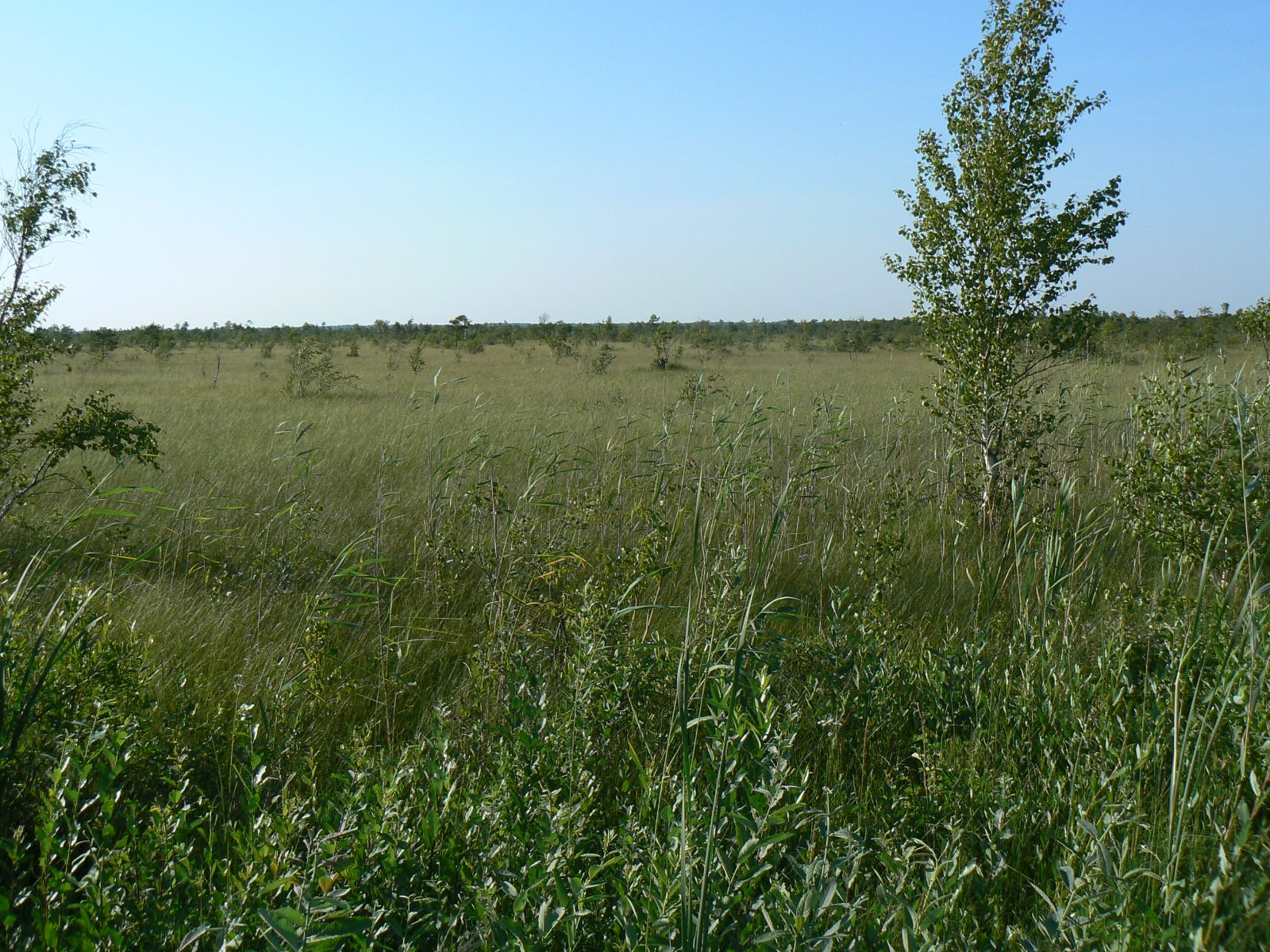

- Location within Estonia
- Location: Estonia
- Coordinates: 58°34′17″N 23°50′58″E
- Area: 3,927 ha (9,700 acres)
- Established: 1981 (2018)

Tuhu Nature Reserve is a nature reserve which is located in Pärnu County, Estonia.

The area of the nature reserve is 3927 ha.

The protected area was founded in 1981 as Tuhu Landscape Conservation Area. In 2005 the protected area was designated to the nature reserve. The goal is to protect Tuhu Bog, its valuable habitat types and its biodiversity.
