= Kihnu Islets Nature Reserve =

Protected area in Estonia

- Interactive map of Kihnu Islets Nature Reserve
- Location: Estonia
- Coordinates: 58°11′N 23°56′E
- Area: 4,200 ha (10,000 acres)
- Established: 1964 (2014)

Kihnu Islets Nature Reserve is a nature reserve which is located in Pärnu County, Estonia.

The area of the nature reserve is 4200 ha.

The protected area was founded in 1964 as Sange Islets botanical-zoological prohibitation area (Estonian: Sangelaidude botaanilis-zooloogiline kaitseala). In 2014 the protected area was designated to the nature reserve.
