= Mõdriku-Roela Landscape Conservation Area =

Nature park in Estonia

- Location within Estonia
- Location: Estonia
- Coordinates: 59°17′N 26°31′E
- Area: 1,630 hectares (4,000 acres)
- Established: 1978 (1986)

Mõdriku-Roela Landscape Conservation Area is a nature park in Lääne-Viru County, Estonia.

The area of the nature park is 1,630 hectares (4,000 acres).

The protected area was founded in 1978 to protect Mõdriku-Roela Esker with Küti and Voore Springs and springlakes. In 1986, the protected area was designated to the landscape conservation area.
