= Rannaniidi Cliffs Landscape Conservation Area =

Protected area in Estonia

- Location within Estonia
- Location: Estonia
- Coordinates: 58°38′30″N 23°21′00″E
- Area: 98 ha (240 acres)
- Established: 1959 (2005)

Rannaniidi Cliffs Landscape Conservation Area is a nature park which is located in Saare County, Estonia.

The area of the nature park is 98 ha.

The protected area was founded in 1959 to protect Rannaniidi Cliffs (Estonian: Rannaniidi pangad). In 2005, the protected area was designated to the landscape conservation area.
