= Laukesoo Nature Reserve =

Protected area in Estonia

- Location within Estonia
- Location: Estonia
- Coordinates: 59°02′19″N 25°19′56″E
- Area: 2,556 ha (6,320 acres)
- Established: 1981

Laukesoo Nature Reserve is a nature reserve which is located in Harju County, Estonia.

The area of the nature reserve is 2556 ha.

The protected area was founded in 1981 on the basis of Laukesoo Wetland Conservation Area.
