= Vinni-Pajusti Landscape Conservation Area =

Nature reserve in Estonia

- Location within Estonia
- Location: Estonia
- Coordinates: 59°17′20″N 26°26′00″E
- Area: 93.2 hectares (230 acres)
- Established: 1958 (2007)

Vinni-Pajusti Landscape Conservation Area is a nature reserve situated in Lääne-Viru County, Estonia.

Its area is 93.2 hectares (230 acres).

The protected area was designated in 1958 to protect Vinni oaks (Estonian: Vinni tammik) and its biodiversity. In 2007, the protected area was redesigned to the landscape conservation area.
