= Linnuraba Nature Reserve =

Protected area in Estonia

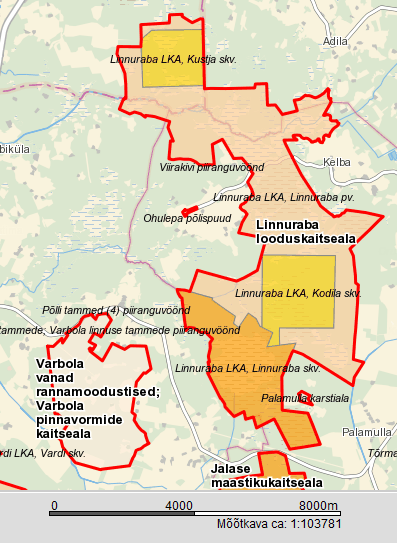
- Map of Linnuraba Nature Reserve

- Location within Estonia
- Location: Estonia
- Coordinates: 59°03′58″N 24°37′38″E
- Area: 2,034 ha (5,030 acres)
- Established: 2005

Linnuraba Nature Reserve is a nature reserve situated in Estonia, in Rapla County.

It is a representative example in Estonia of floodplain grasslands.
