= Kämbla Nature Reserve =

Protected area in Estonia

- Location within Estonia
- Location: Estonia
- Coordinates: 59°13′04″N 25°00′44″E
- Area: 164 ha (410 acres)
- Established: 1991 (1998)

Kämbla Nature Reserve is a nature reserve which is located in Harju County, Estonia.

The area of the nature reserve is 164 ha.

The protected area was founded in 1991 on the basis of Oti botanical-zoological conservation area (Estonian: Oti botaanilis-zooloogiline kaitseala). In 1998 the protected area was designated to the nature reserve.
