= Ontika Landscape Conservation Area =

Protected area in Estonia

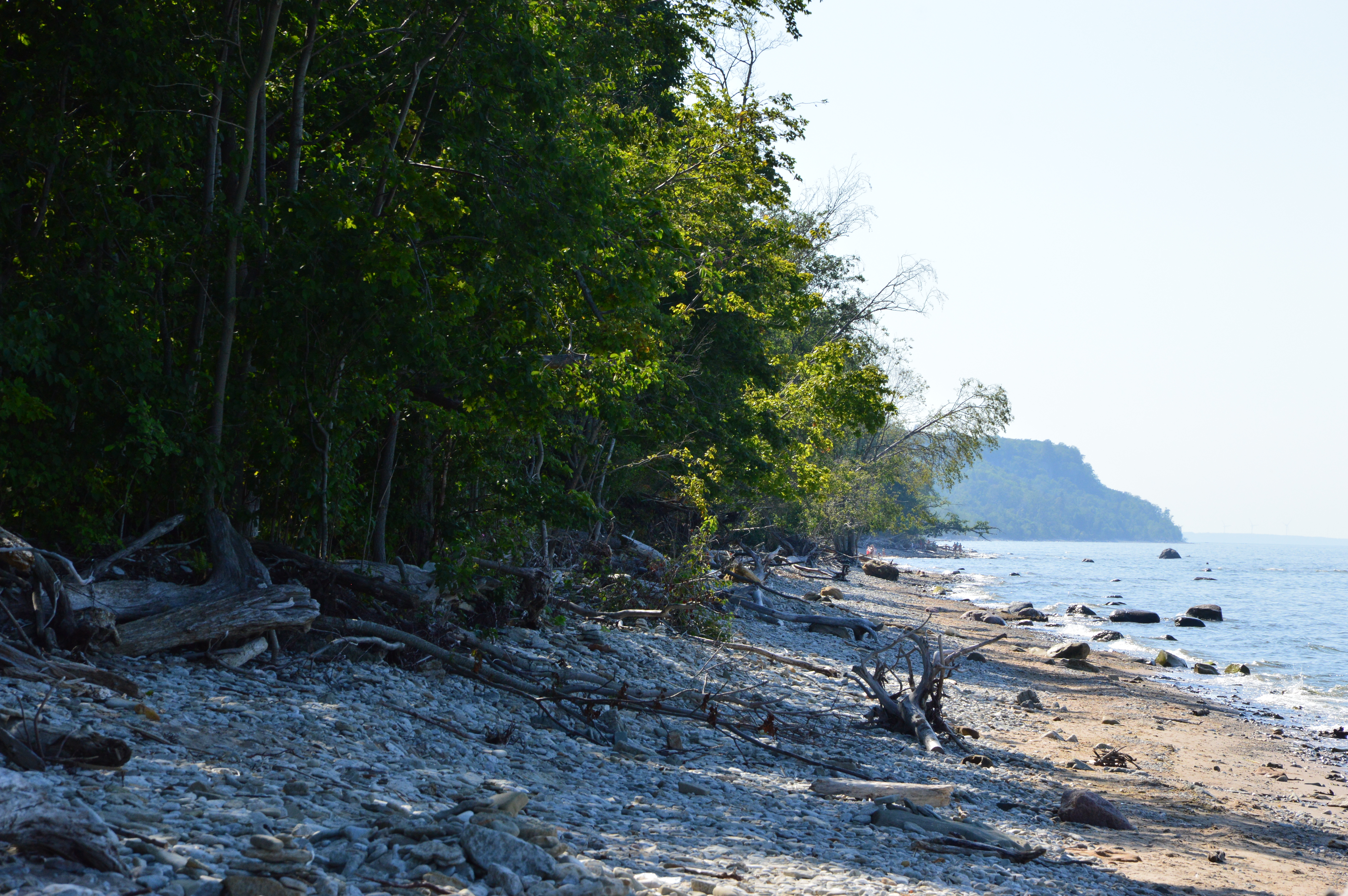

- Location within Estonia
- Location: Estonia
- Coordinates: 59°26′45″N 27°22′30″E
- Area: 1,338 hectares (3,310 acres)
- Established: 1939

Ontika Landscape Conservation Area is a nature park which is located in Ida-Viru County, Estonia.

The area of the nature park is 1,338 hectares (3,310 acres).

The protected area was founded in 1939 to protect the coast and forest of Sakka-Ontika. In 1957, the Saka-Ontika-Toila Klint Prohibited Area was established.
