= Mukri Landscape Conservation Area =

Protected area in Estonia

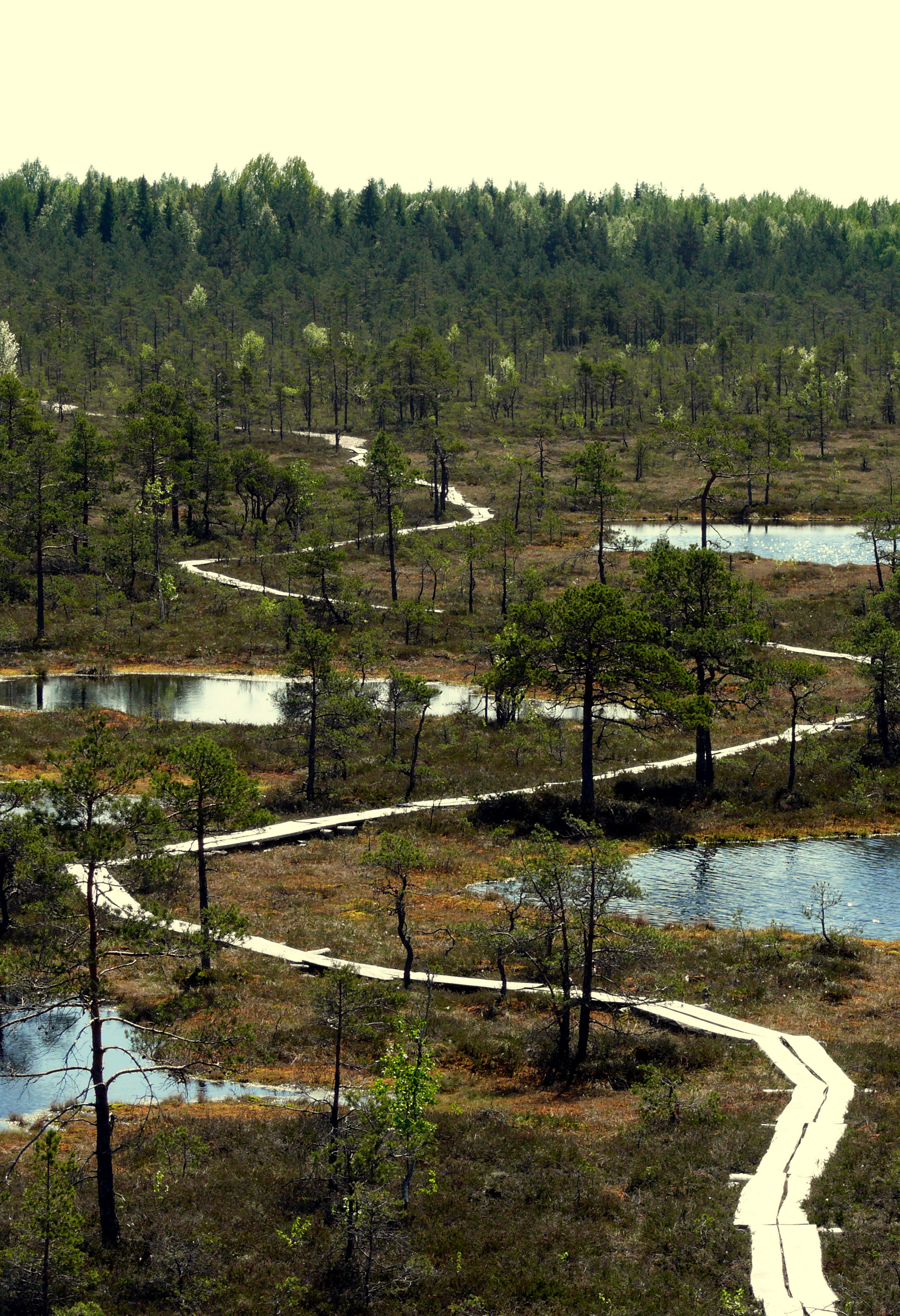

- Location within Estonia
- Location: Estonia
- Coordinates: 58°45′N 25°00′E
- Area: 2,158 ha (5,330 acres)
- Established: 1992 (2009)

Mukri Landscape Conservation Area is a nature park is located in Rapla County, Estonia.

The area of the nature park is 2158 ha.

The protected area was founded in 1992 to protect Mukri and Ellamaa Bog and theirs biodiversity.
