= Puiga =

Village in Estonia

- Location within Estonia
- Coordinates: 57°47′51″N 27°01′53″E
- Country: Estonia
- County: Võru County
- Municipality: Võru Parish

Puiga is a village in Estonia, in Võru Parish, which belongs to Võru County.
