= Kesknõmme Nature Reserve =

Nature reserve in Estonia

- Interactive map of Kesknõmme Nature Reserve
- Location: Estonia
- Coordinates: 58.4431°N 22.0392°E
- Area: 481 ha (1,190 acres)
- Established: 1959

Kesknõmme Nature Reserve is a nature reserve which is located in Saare County, Estonia.

The area of the nature reserve is 481 ha.

History of the protected area dates back to the year 1959 when Sepise yew was taken under protection. In 1965, the borders were widened.
