= Järvevälja Landscape Conservation Area =

Protected area in Estonia

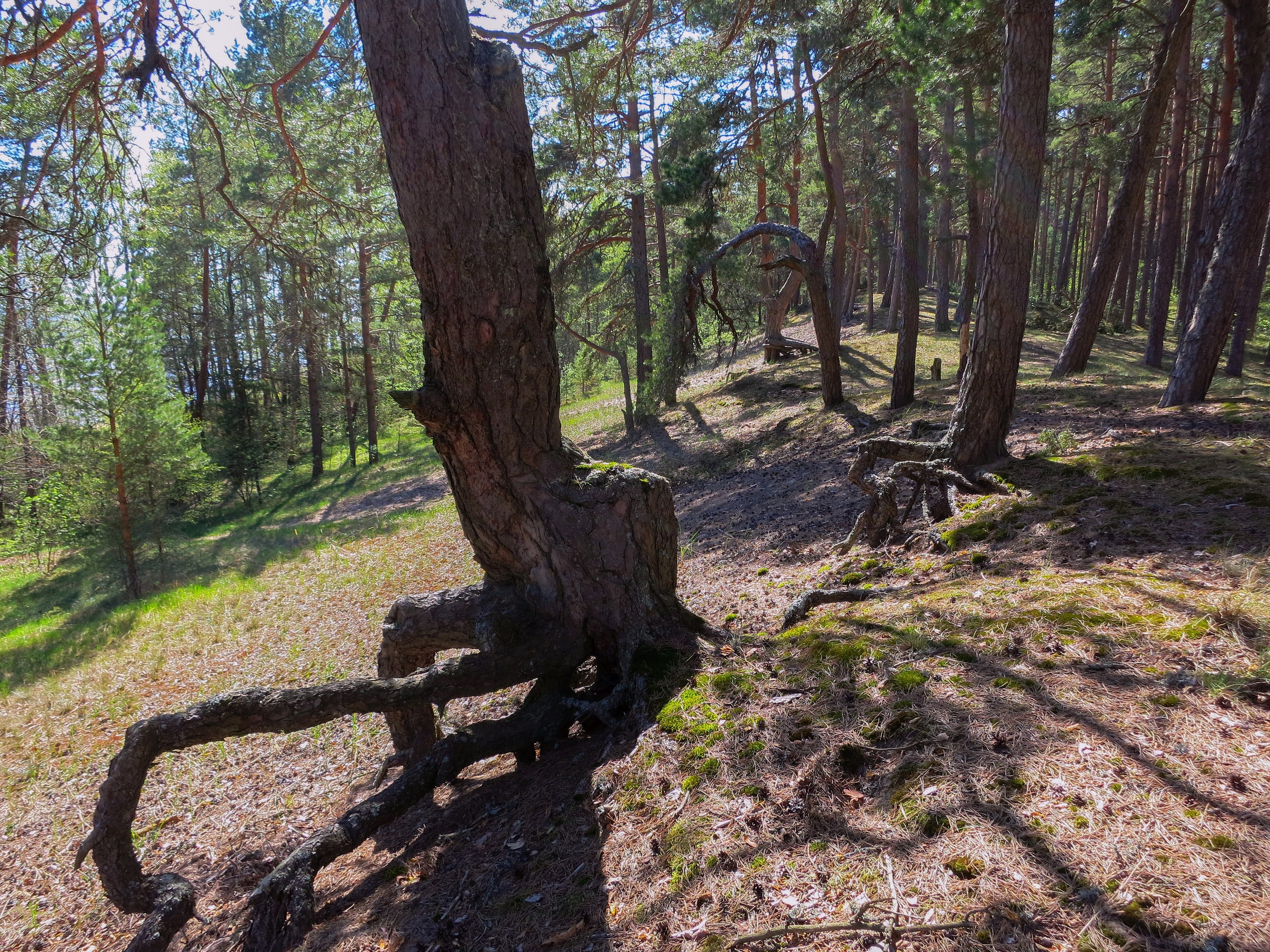

- Location within Estonia
- Location: Estonia
- Coordinates: 58°59′N 27°09′E
- Area: 310 ha (770 acres)
- Established: 1967 (2017)

Järvevälja Landscape Conservation Area is a nature park situated in Ida-Viru County, Estonia.

Its area is 310 ha.

The protected area was designated in 1967 to protect Järvevälja Dunes (:et) and its surrounding areas. In 2017, the protected area was redesigned to the landscape conservation area.
