= Rakvere Oak-forest Landscape Conservation Area =

Protected area in Estonia

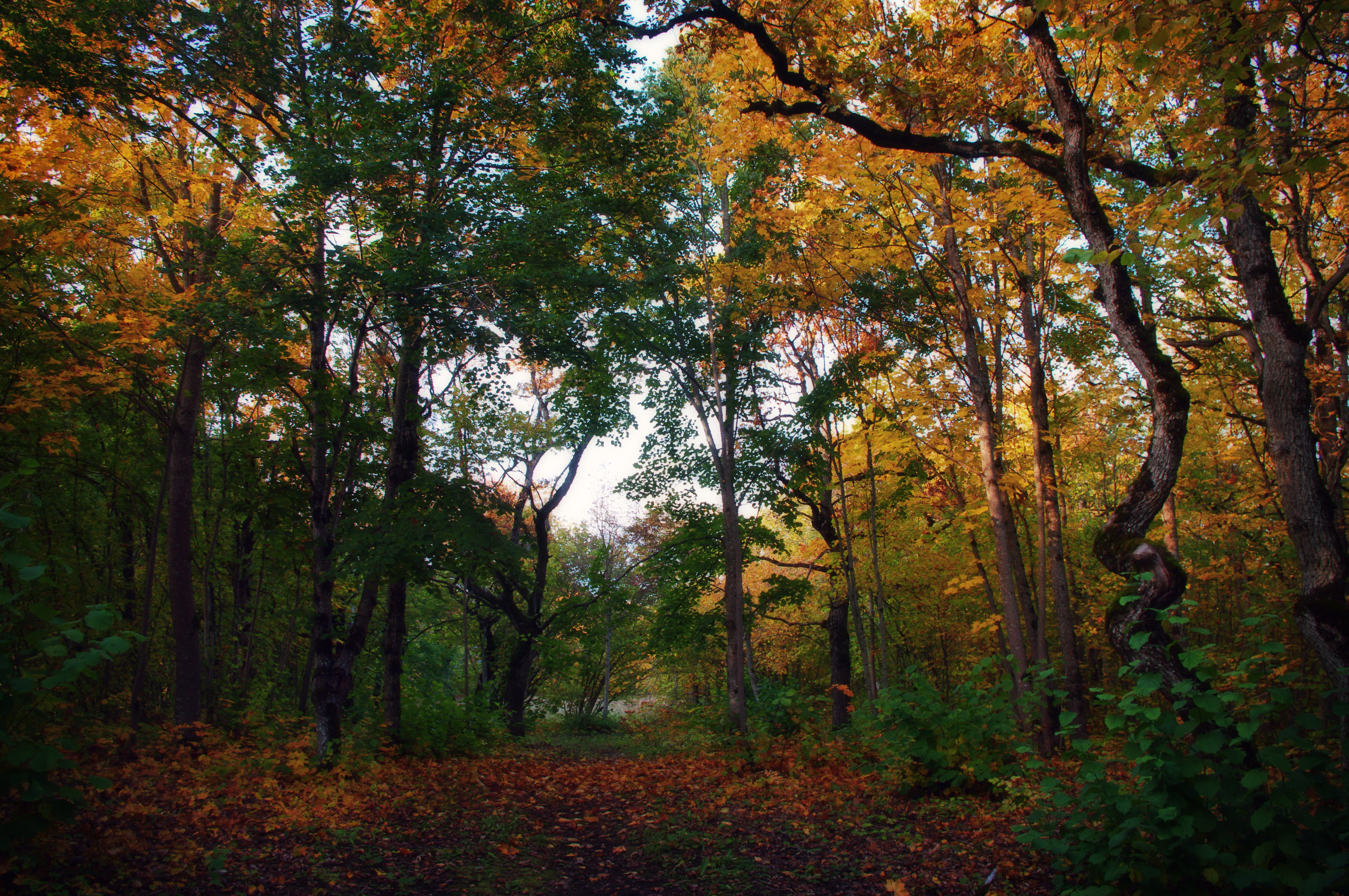

- Location within Estonia
- Location: Estonia
- Coordinates: 59°20′15″N 26°21′05″E
- Area: 25 ha (62 acres)
- Established: 1939 (2017)

Rakvere Oak-forest Landscape Conservation Area is a nature park which is located in Lääne-Viru County, Estonia.

The area of the nature park is 25 ha.

The protected area was founded in 1939 to protect Rakvere Oak Forest. In 1999, the protected area was designated to the landscape conservation area.
