= Kurese Landscape Conservation Area =

Protected area in Estonia

- Location within Estonia
- Location: Estonia
- Coordinates: 58°38′30″N 24°07′30″E
- Area: 525 ha (1,300 acres)
- Established: 1976 (2007)

Kurese Landscape Conservation Area is a nature park located in Pärnu County, Estonia.

It covers an area of 525 ha.

The protected area was designated in 1976 to protect Salumägi Hill and its surrounding areas. In 2007, the protected area was reclassified as a landscape conservation area.
