= Mädapea Oak-forest Landscape Conservation Area =

Protected area in Estonia

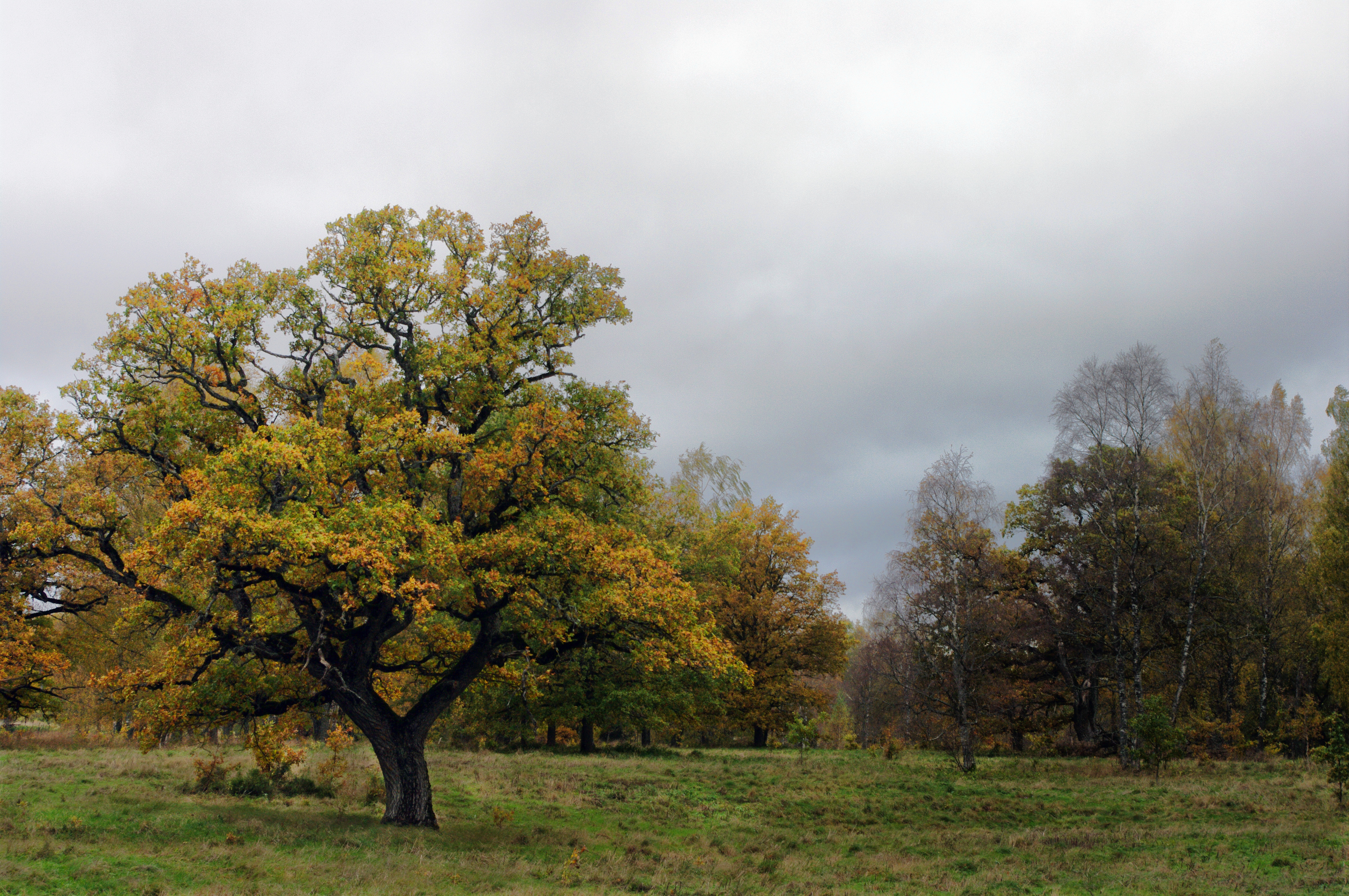

- Location within Estonia
- Location: Estonia
- Coordinates: 59°19′23″N 26°15′35″E
- Area: 72 ha (180 acres)
- Established: 1958 (2007)

Mädapea Oak-forest Landscape Conservation Area is a nature park is located in Lääne-Viru County, Estonia.

The area of the nature park is 72 ha.

The protected area was founded in 1958 to protect Mädapea Oak Forest and its surrounding areas. In 2007, the protected area was designated to the landscape conservation area.
