= Haavassoo Nature Reserve =

Protected area in Estonia

- Location within Estonia
- Location: Estonia
- Coordinates: 58°14′N 22°12′E
- Area: 401 ha (990 acres)
- Established: 2014

Haavassoo Nature Reserve is a nature reserve which is located in Saare County, Estonia.

The area of the nature reserve is 401 ha.

The protected area was founded in 2006 on the basis of Haavassoo Protected Area (Estonian: Haavassoo hoiuala).
