= Iganõmme Landscape Conservation Area =

Protected area in Estonia

- Location within Estonia
- Location: Estonia
- Coordinates: 58°55′50″N 24°11′05″E
- Area: 5 ha (12 acres)
- Established: 1960 (2006)

Iganõmme Landscape Conservation Area is a nature park situated in Rapla County, Estonia.

Its area is 5 ha.

The protected area was designated in 1960 to protect Iganõmme Pakamäe Outcrop (:et) and its surrounding areas. In 2006, the protected area was redesignated a landscape conservation area.
