= Nõva Nature Reserve =

Protected area in Estonia

- Location within Estonia
- Location: Estonia
- Coordinates: 59°13′N 23°37′E
- Area: 2,390 ha (5,900 acres)
- Established: 1985 (2017)

Nõva Nature Reserve is a nature reserve which is located in Lääne County, Estonia.

The area of the nature reserve is 2390 ha.

The protected area was founded in 1985 on the basis of Nõva plant protection area, and on the basis of Nõva Landscape Conservation Area (founded in 1997).
