= Vahenurme Nature Reserve =

Protected area in Estonia

- Location within Estonia
- Location: Estonia
- Nearest city: Pärnu
- Coordinates: 58°38′38″N 24°23′28″E
- Established: 2006

Vahenurme Nature Reserve is a nature reserve situated in western Estonia, in Pärnu County.

The nature reserve has been established to protect the biologically diverse wooden meadows and forests of the area. It comprises an area of former agricultural land that has turned or is turning into forest. 239 species of vascular plants have been counted in Vahenurme Nature Reserve. Of these, 12 are protected.
