= Lümandu Landscape Conservation Area =

Protected area in Estonia

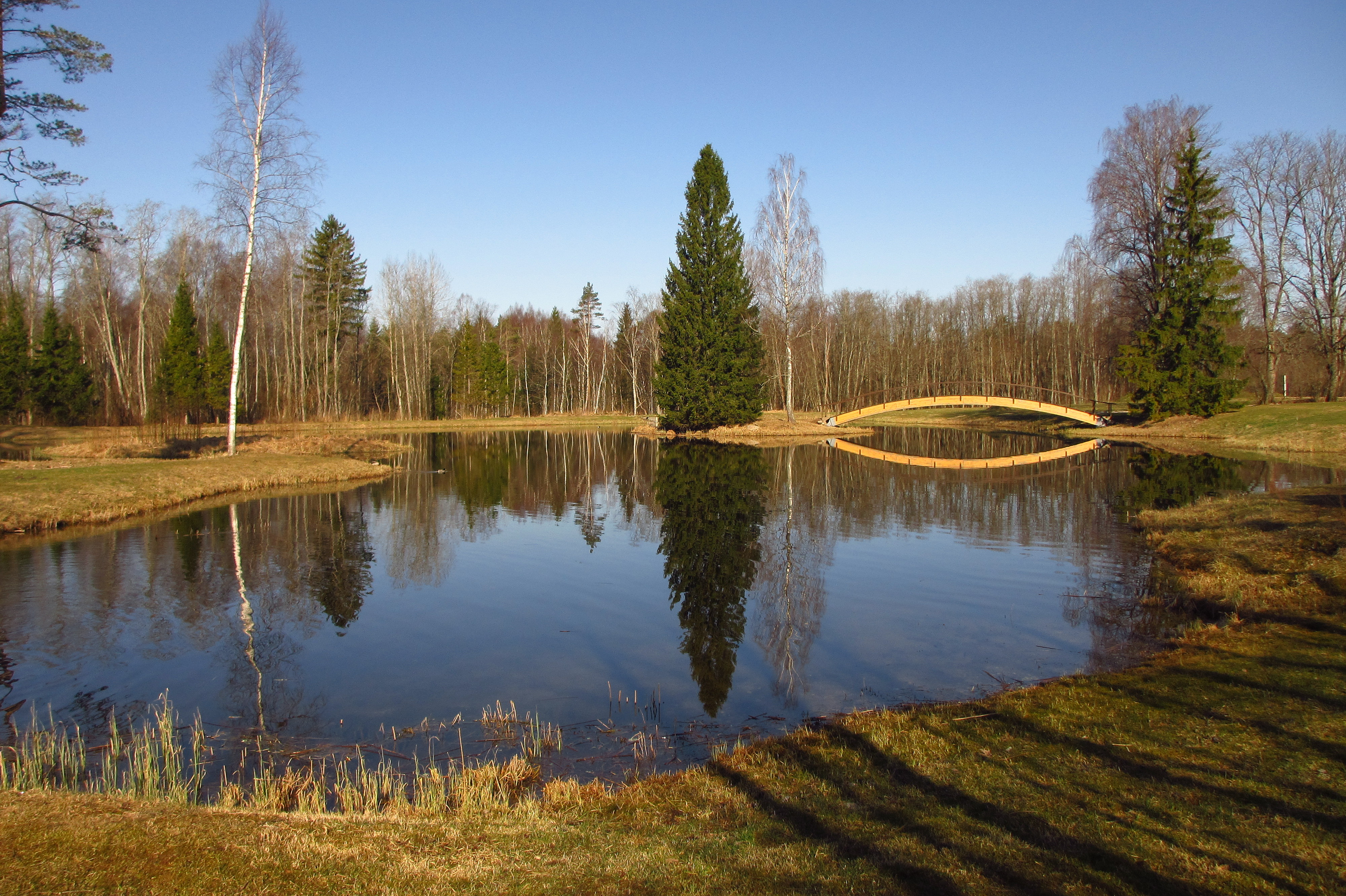

- Location within Estonia
- Location: Estonia
- Coordinates: 59°10′30″N 24°34′30″E
- Area: 107 ha (260 acres)
- Established: 1981 (2006)

Lümandu Landscape Conservation Area is a nature park is located in Rapla County, Estonia.

The area of the nature park is 107 ha.

The protected area was founded in 1981 to protect Lümandu Springs and Lümandu botanical conservation area. In 2006, the protected area was designated to the landscape conservation area.
