= Viieristi Nature Reserve =

Protected area in Estonia

- Location within Estonia
- Location: Estonia
- Nearest city: Kuressaare
- Coordinates: 58°00′55″N 22°10′34″E
- Area: 378 ha (930 acres)
- Established: 1965

Viieristi Nature Reserve is a nature reserve situated on Saaremaa island in western Estonia, in Saare County.

The area which Viireristi Nature Reserve is designated to protect is rich in variation. An unusual feature is lake Koltsi, a body of water which only exists during spring. The area is situated on an escarpment between 24 and 27 metres high, by the sea, and consists of different kinds of forest and wetlands. It is part of the EU-wide Natura 2000-network.
