= Paunküla Landscape Conservation Area =

Protected area in Estonia

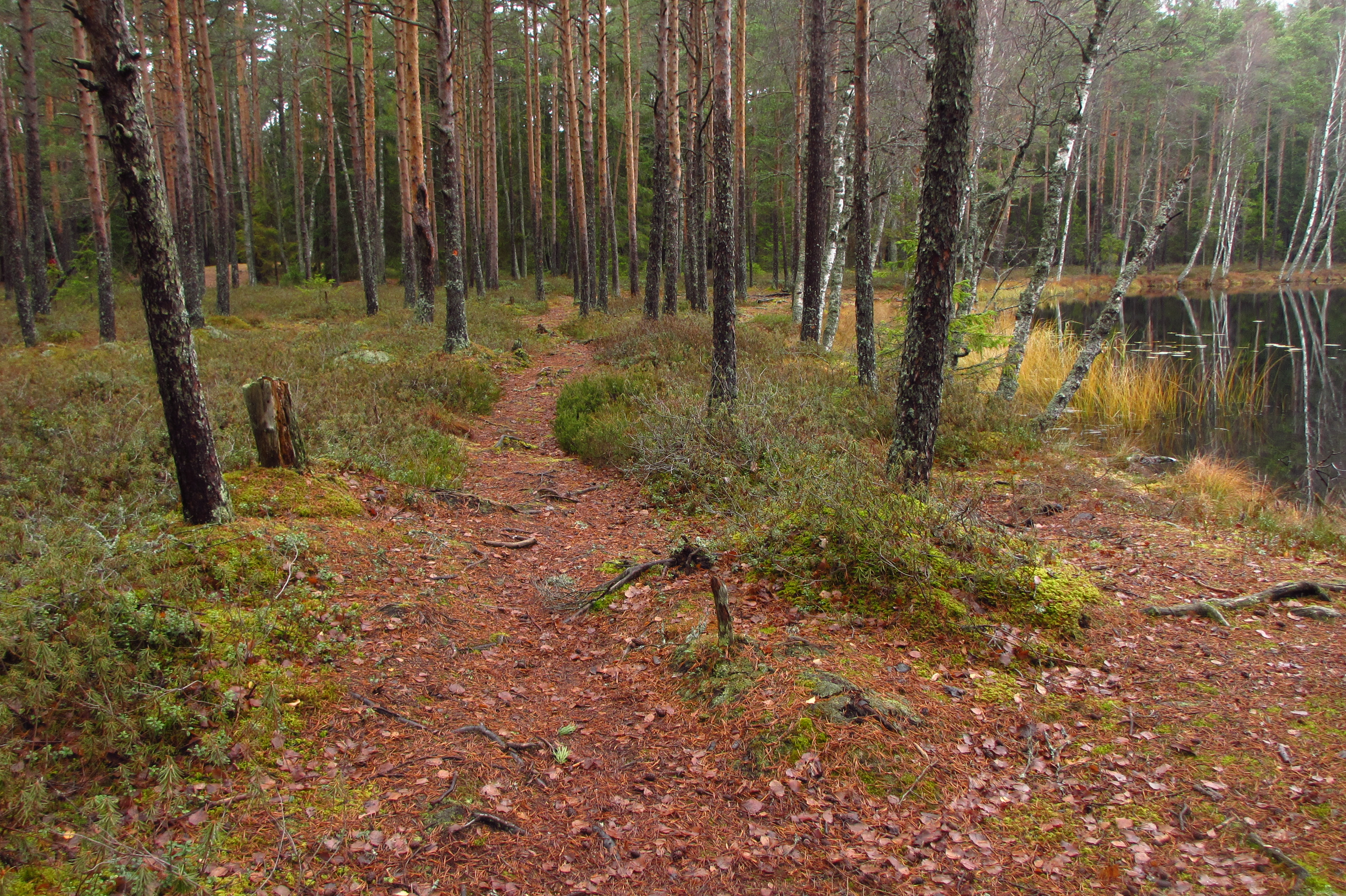

- Location within Estonia
- Location: Estonia
- Coordinates: 59°08′25″N 25°16′45″E
- Area: 623 ha (1,540 acres)
- Established: 1981 (2006)

Paunküla Landscape Conservation Area is a nature park which is located in Harju County, Estonia.

The area of the nature park is 623 ha.

The protected area was founded in 1981 to protect Paunküla Hills and the lakes between the hills.
