= Pilkuse Landscape Conservation Area =

Protected area in Estonia

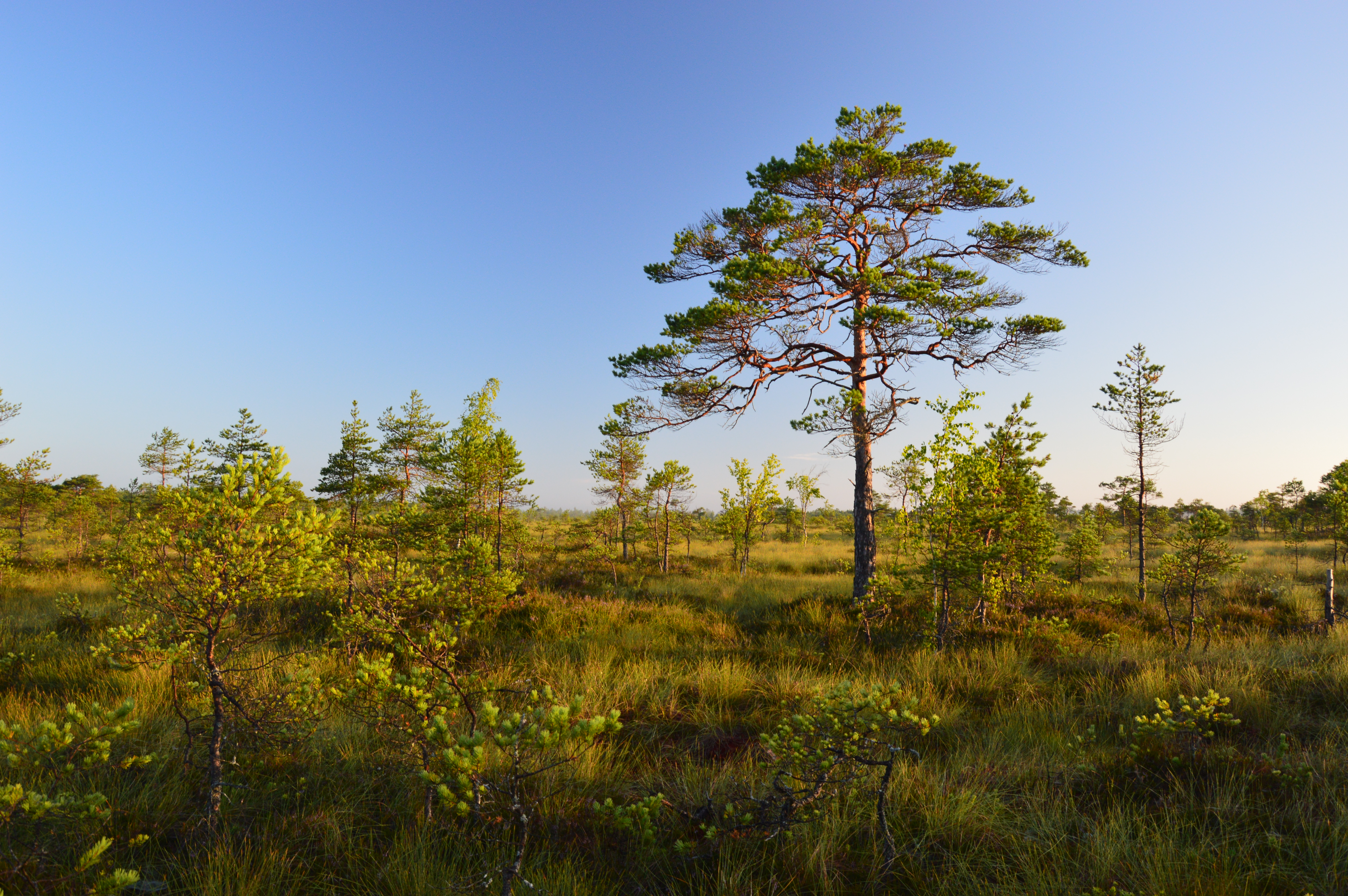

- Location within Estonia
- Location: Estonia
- Coordinates: 58°48′30″N 24°15′30″E
- Area: 480 ha (1,200 acres)
- Established: 1992 (2017)

Pilkuse Landscape Conservation Area is a nature park which is located in Rapla County, Estonia.

The area of the nature park is 480 ha.

The protected area was founded in 1992 to protect Pilkuse Bog and its biodiversity.
