= Odalätsi Landscape Conservation Area =

Protected area in Estonia

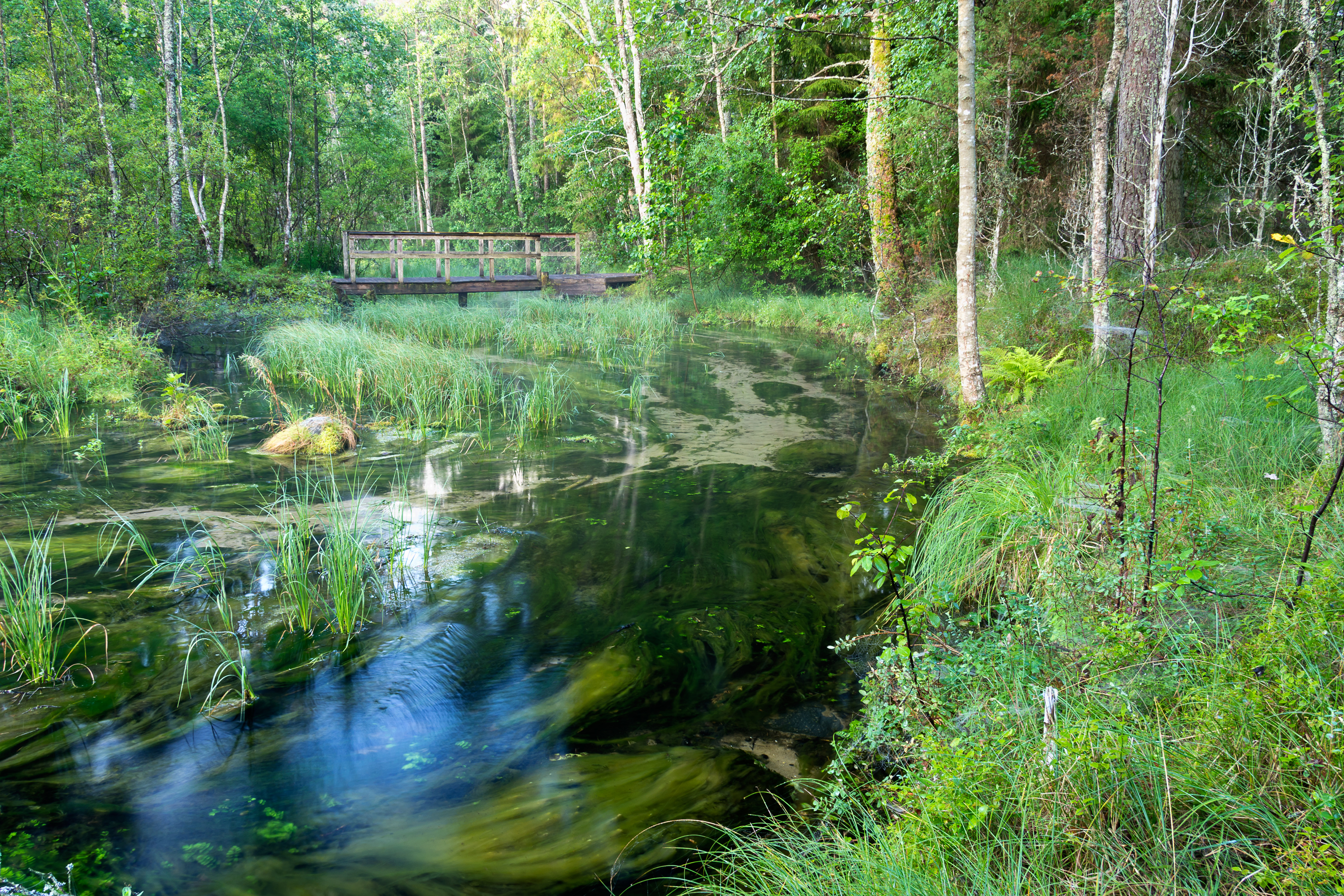

- Location within Estonia
- Location: Estonia
- Coordinates: 58°23′30″N 22°07′00″E
- Area: 164 ha (410 acres)
- Established: 1959 (2007)

Odalätsi Landscape Conservation Area is a nature park which is located in Saare County, Estonia.

The area of the nature park is 164 ha.

The protected area was founded in 1959 to protect Odalätsi Dunes. In 1973, Odalätsi Springs were also taken under protection. In 2007, the protected area was designated to the landscape conservation area.
