= Kaugatoma-Lõu Landscape Conservation Area =

Protected area in Estonia

- Location within Estonia
- Location: Estonia
- Coordinates: 58°06′N 22°11′E
- Area: 596 ha (1,470 acres)
- Established: 1973 (2017)

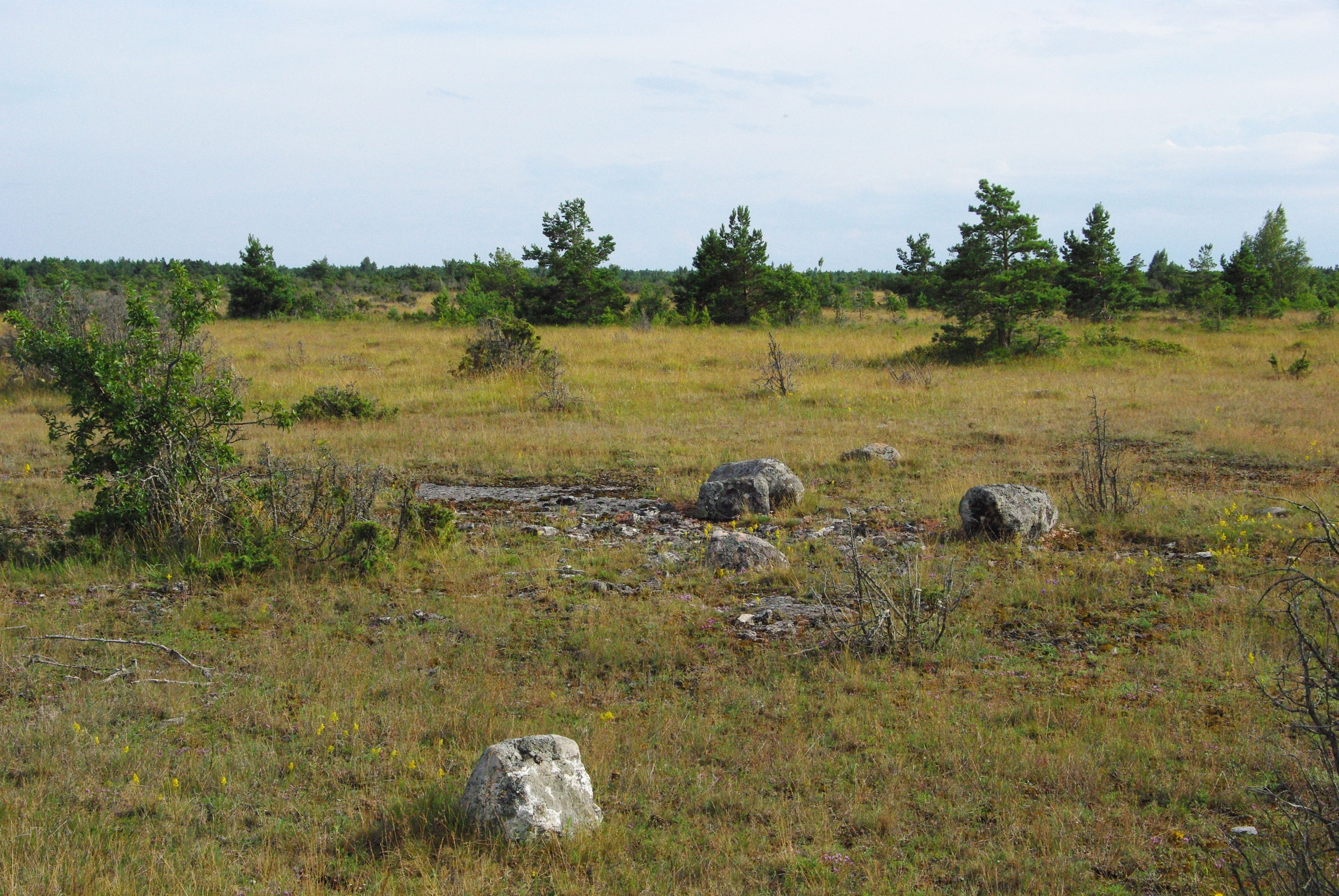

Kaugatoma-Lõu Landscape Conservation Area is a nature park situated in Saare County, Estonia.

Its area is 596 ha.

The protected area was designated in 1973 to protect Kaugatoma Cliff and its surrounding areas. In 2000, the protected area was redesigned to the landscape conservation area.
