= Kivikupitsa Landscape Conservation Area =

Protected area in Estonia

- Location within Estonia
- Location: Estonia
- Coordinates: 57°55′40″N 24°27′40″E
- Area: 136 ha (340 acres)
- Established: 1964 (2007)

Kivikupitsa Landscape Conservation Area is a nature park situated in Pärnu County, Estonia.

Its area is 136 ha.

The protected area was designated in 1964 to protect Kivikupitsa Hill and its surrounding areas. In 2007, the protected area was redesigned to the landscape conservation area.
