= Niidu Landscape Conservation Area =

Nature park in Estonia

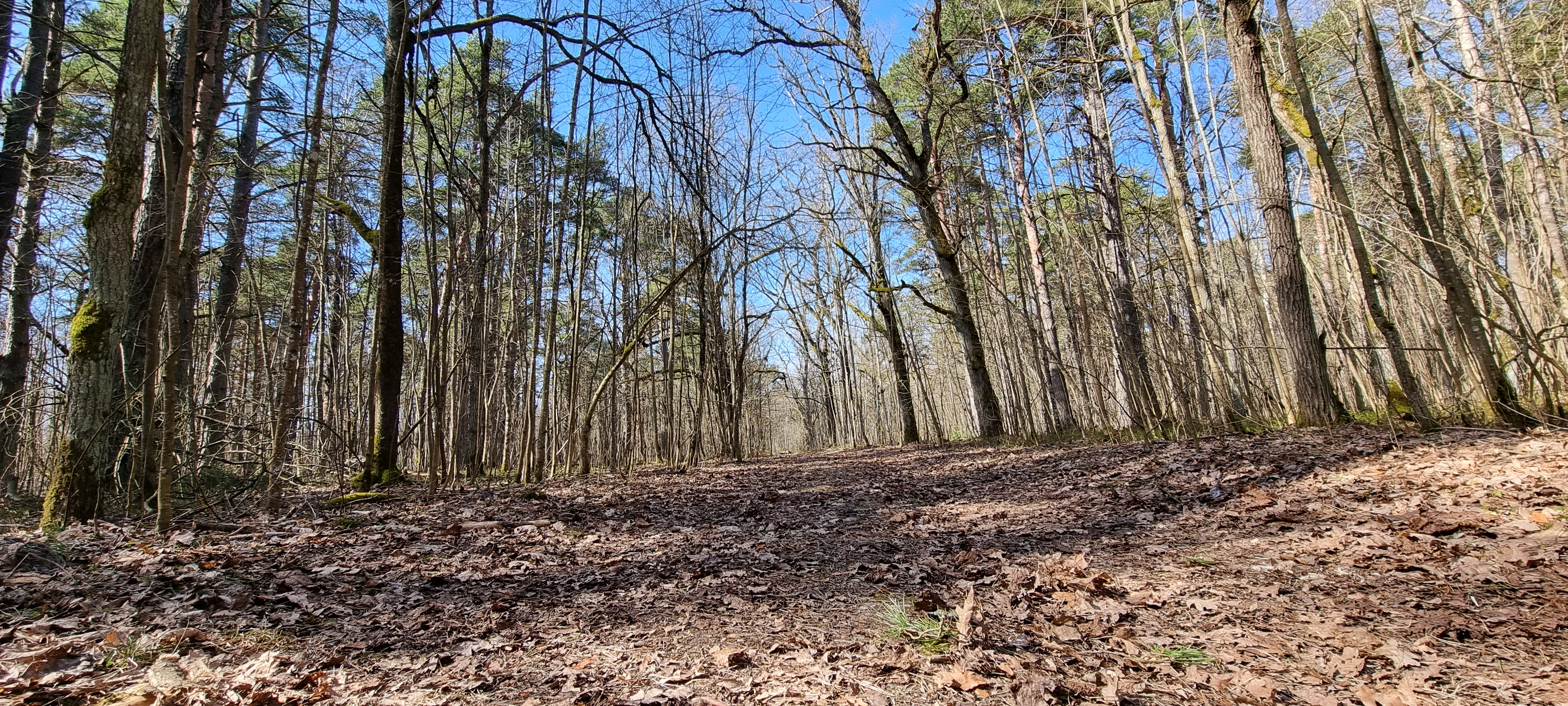

- Location within Estonia
- Location: Estonia
- Coordinates: 58°22′54″N 24°32′50″E
- Area: 68 hectares (170 acres)
- Established: 1958

Niidu Landscape Conservation Area is a nature park which is located in Pärnu, Estonia.

The area of the nature park is 68 hectares (170 acres).

The protected area was founded in 1958 to protect forest landscapes and communities, bird colonies of Pärnu.
