= Porkuni Landscape Conservation Area =

Nature park in Estonia

- Location within Estonia
- Location: Estonia
- Coordinates: 59°12′N 26°11′E
- Area: 1,152 hectares (2,850 acres)
- Established: 1978 (2005)

Porkuni Landscape Conservation Area is a nature park which is located in Lääne-Viru County, Estonia.

The area of the nature park is 1,152 hectares (2,850 acres).

The protected area was founded in 1978 to protect Võhmetu-Lemküla-Porkuni karst lakes and eskers. In 2005, the protected area was designated to the landscape conservation area.
