= Järve Dunes Landscape Conservation Area =

Protected area in Estonia

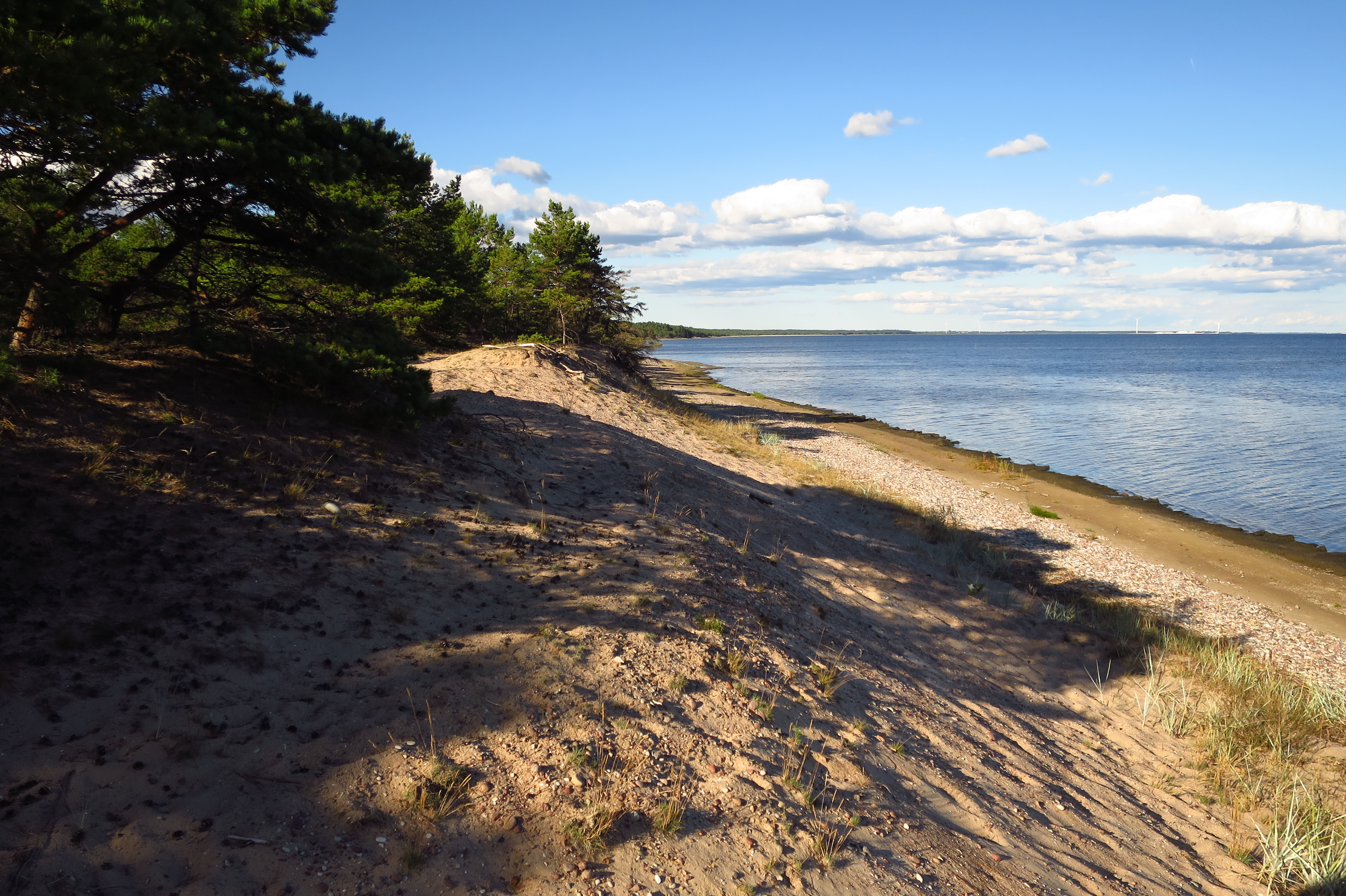

- Location within Estonia
- Location: Estonia
- Coordinates: 58°12′00″N 22°17′30″E
- Area: 96 ha (240 acres)
- Established: 1959 (2005)

Järve Dunes Landscape Conservation Area is a nature park situated in Saare County, Estonia.

Its area is 96 ha.

The protected area was designated in 1959 to protect Järve Dunes (:et). In 2005, the protected area was redesigned to the landscape conservation area.
