= Audru Polder's Nature Reserve =

Protected area in Estonia

- Location within Estonia
- Location: Estonia
- Coordinates: 58°23′00″N 24°19′30″E
- Area: 1,001 hectares (2,470 acres)
- Established: 2007

Audru Polder's Nature Reserve is a nature reserve which is located in Pärnu County, Estonia.

The area of the nature reserve is 1,001 hectares (2,470 acres).

The protected area was founded in 2007 on the basis of Audru Polder's Protected Area (Estonian: Audru poldri hoiuala) and partly Pärnu Bay Protected Area (Estonian: Pärnu lahe hoiuala).
