= Albu Parish =

Former municipality of Estonia

Albu Parish Albu vald
- Former municipality
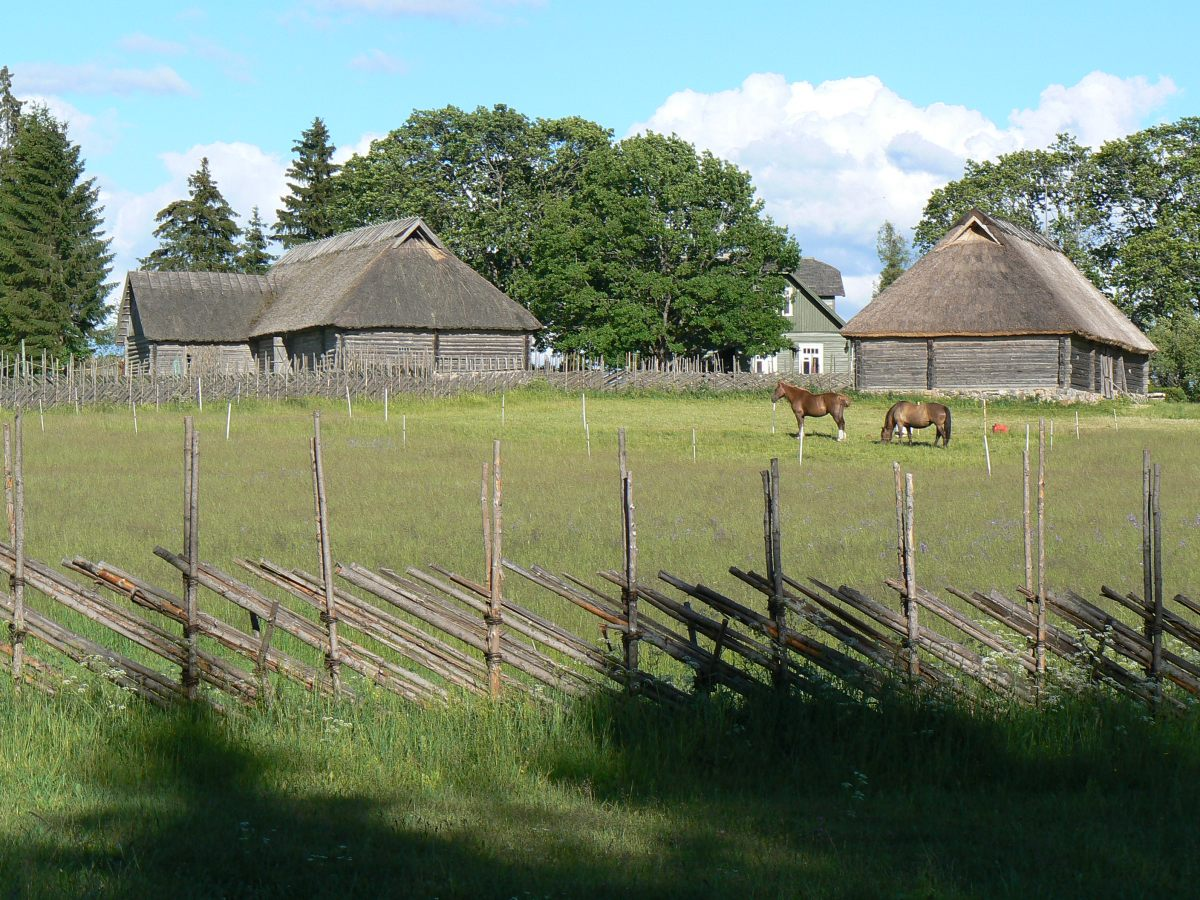
- Tammsaare farm

- Flag Coat of arms

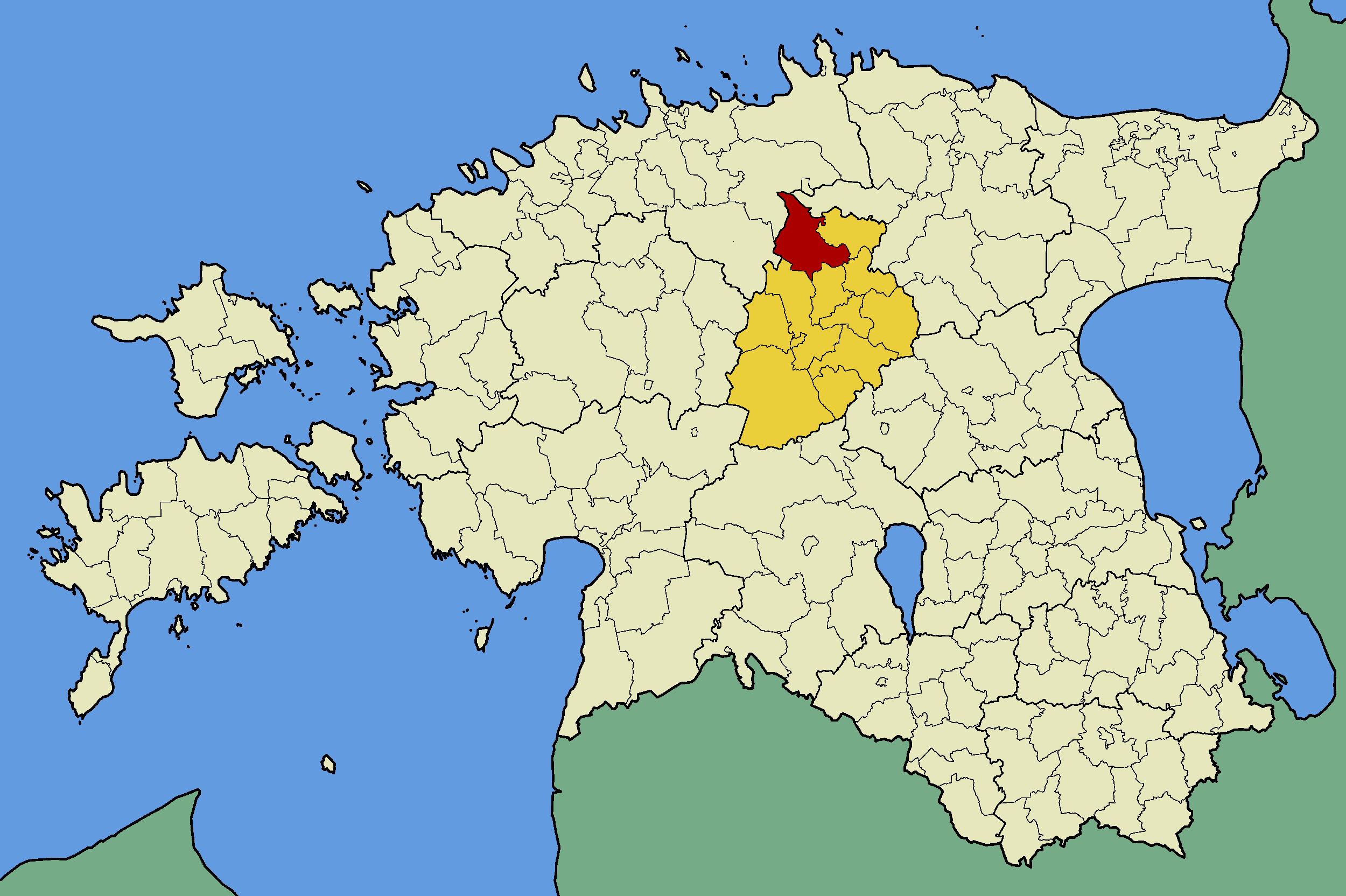
- Albu Parish within Järva County.
- Country: Estonia
- County: Järva County
- Administrative centre: Järva-Madise

Area
  - Total: 257 km^{2} (99 sq mi)

Population (2007)
  - Total: 1,410
  - Density: 5.49/km^{2} (14.2/sq mi)
- Website: www.albu.ee

Albu (Estonian: Albu vald) was a rural municipality of Estonia, in Järva County. It had a population of 1410 (2007) and an area of 257 km^{2} (99 sq mi).

== Villages ==
Albu Parish had 16 villages:

Ageri - Ahula - Albu - Järva-Madise - Kaalepi - Lehtmetsa - Mägede - Mõnuvere - Neitla - Orgmetsa - Peedu - Pullevere - Seidla - Soosalu - Sugalepa - Vetepere

== Gallery ==
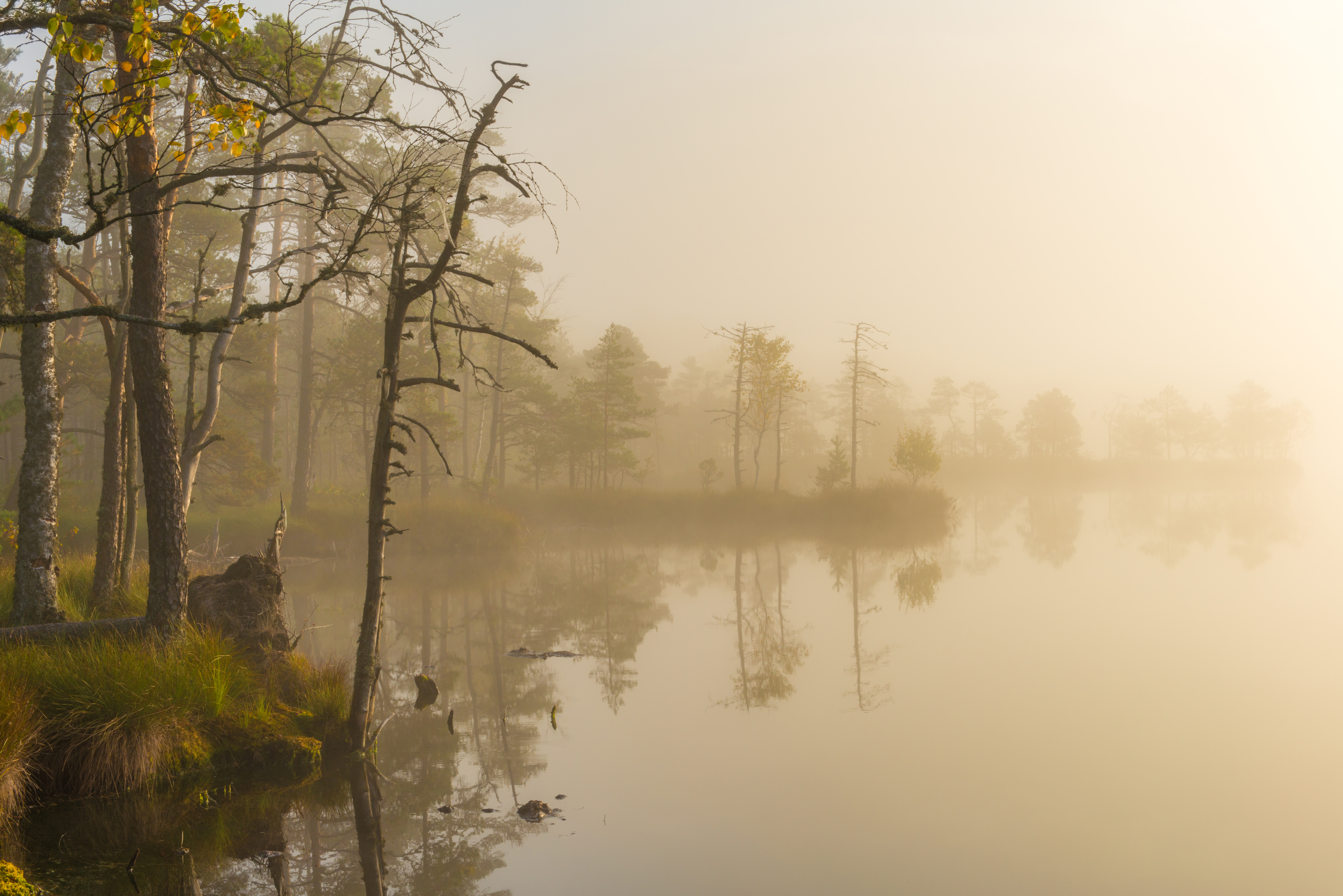
Morning fog on Kakerdaja bog

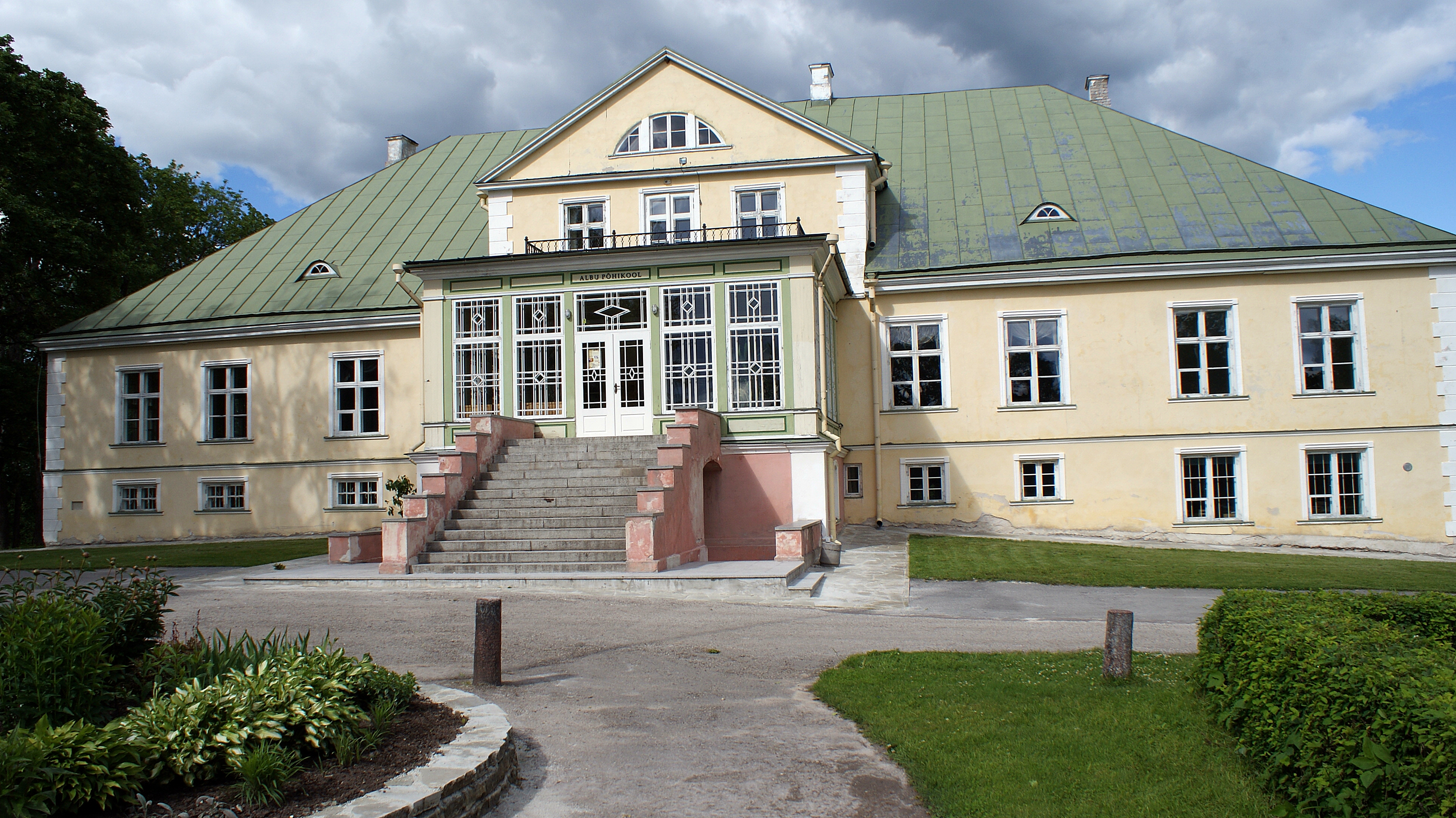
Albu manor

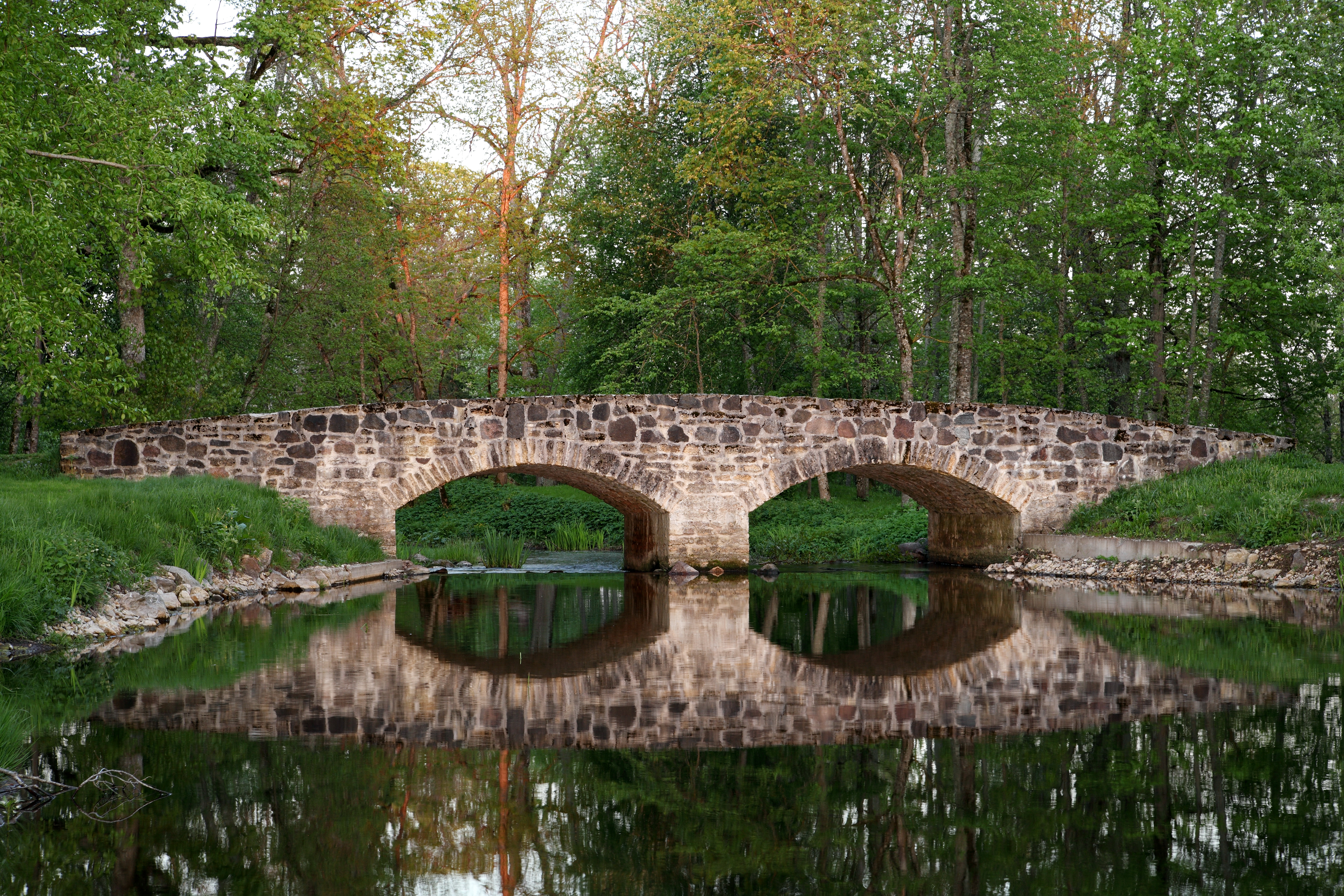
Albu manor park bridge over the Ambla river

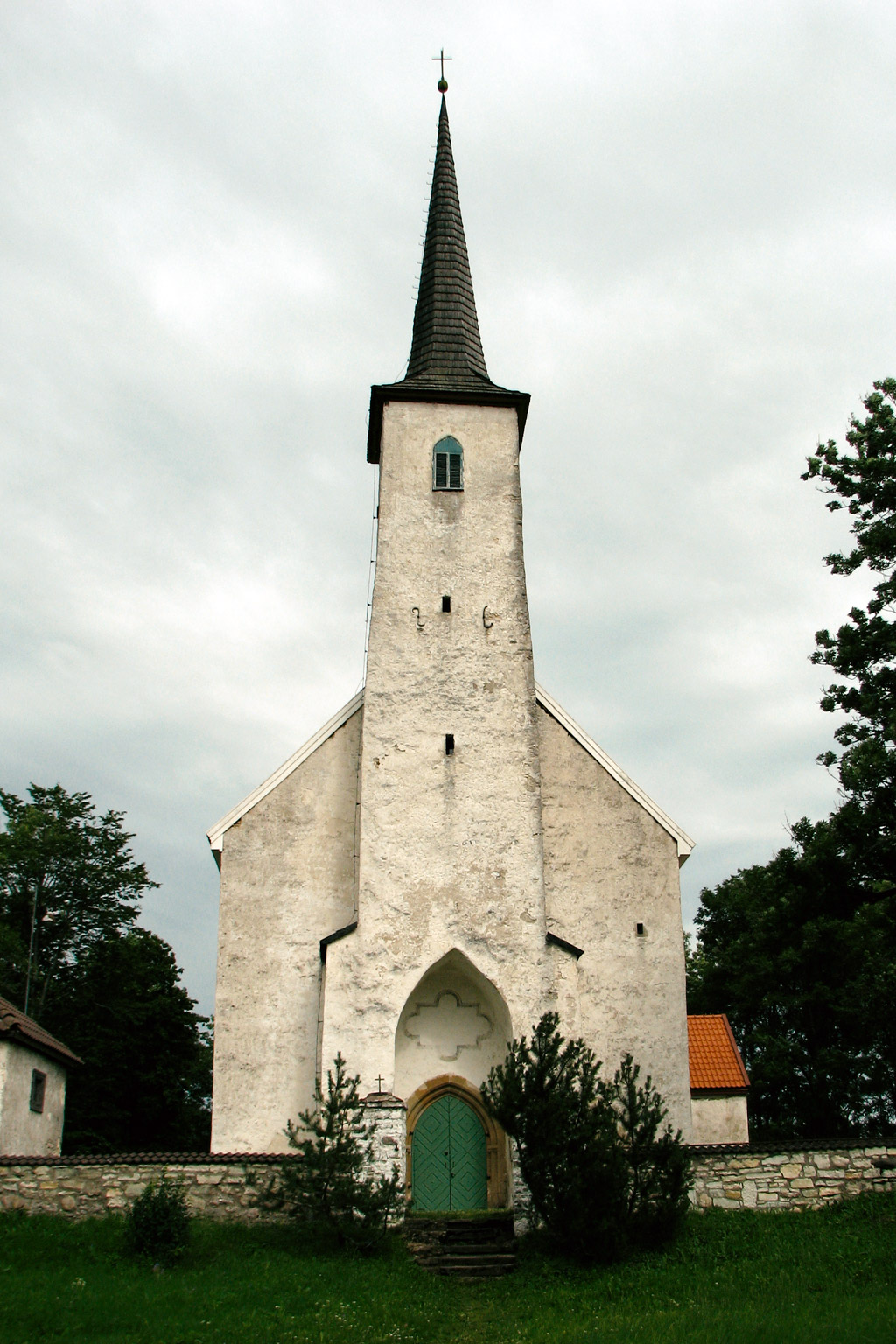
Järva-Madise church

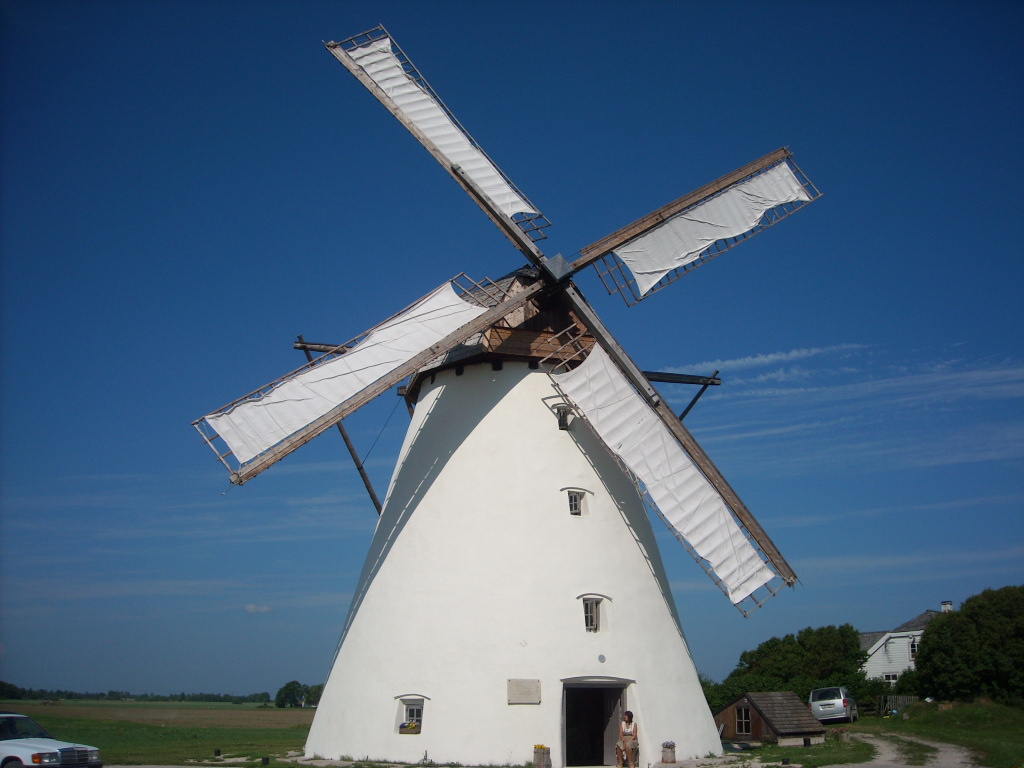
Seidla windmill

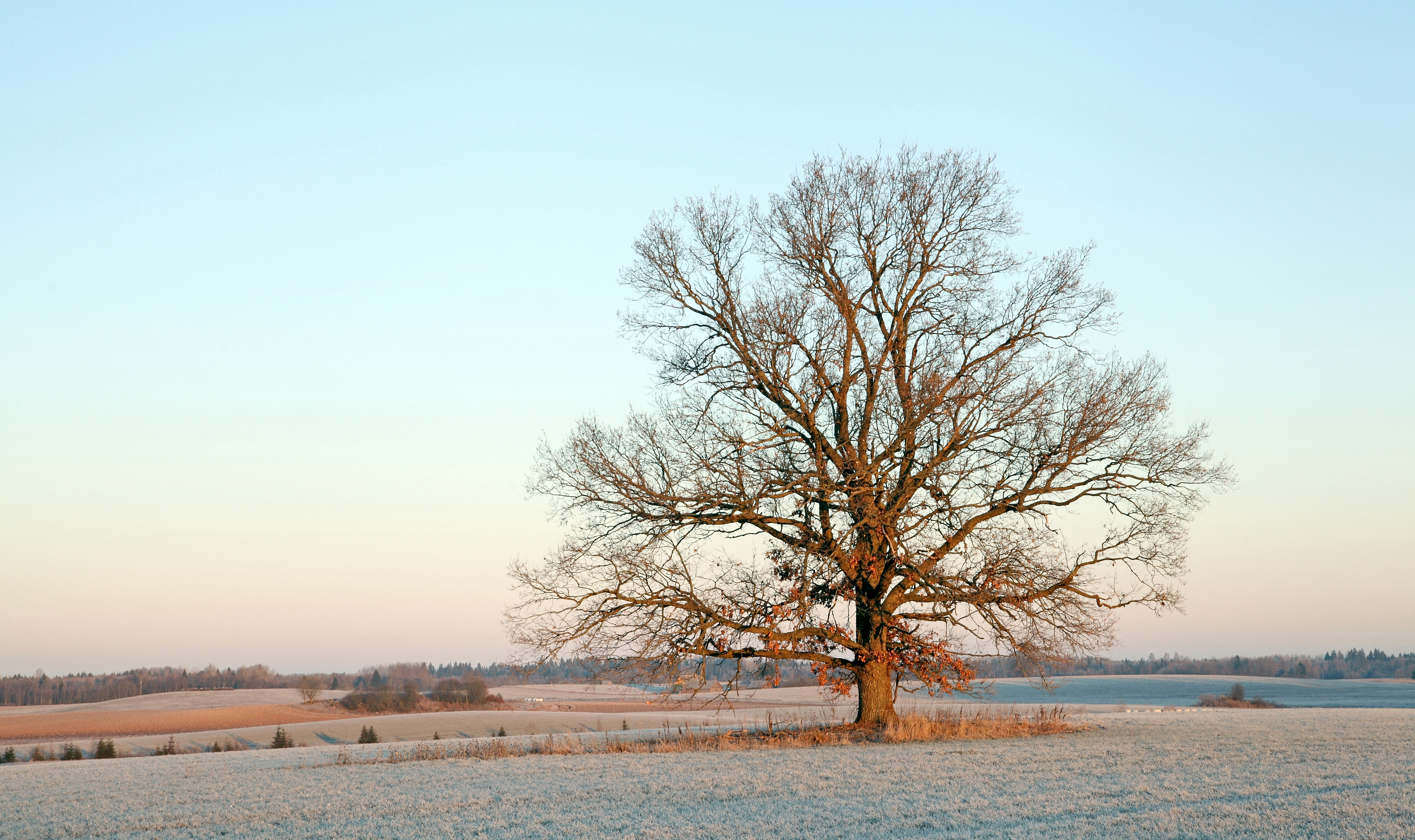
Albu oak

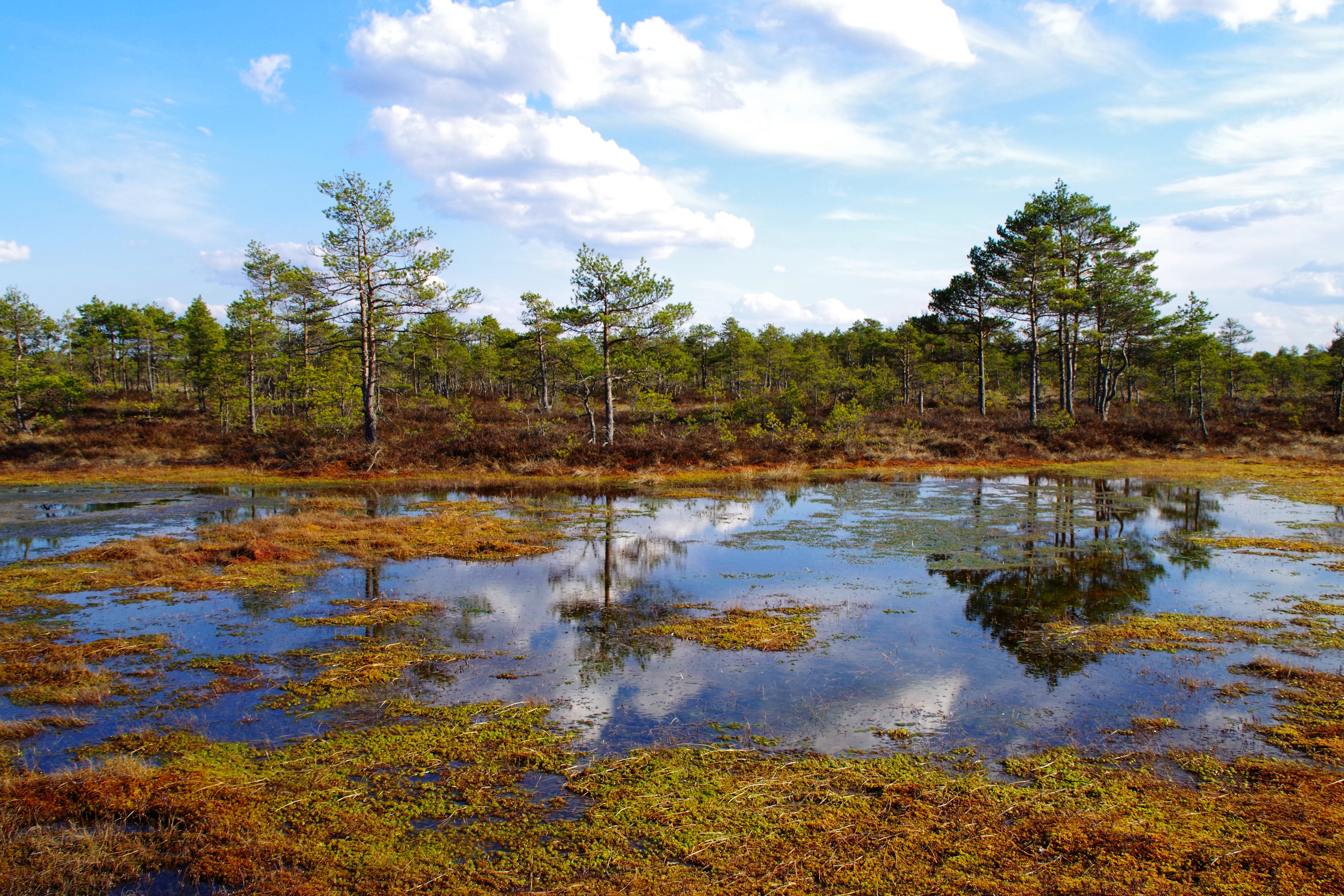
Kakerdaja bog in spring
