= Ambla Parish =

Former municipality of Estonia

Coordinates: 59.191°N 25.846°E

Ambla Parish Ambla vald
- Former municipality
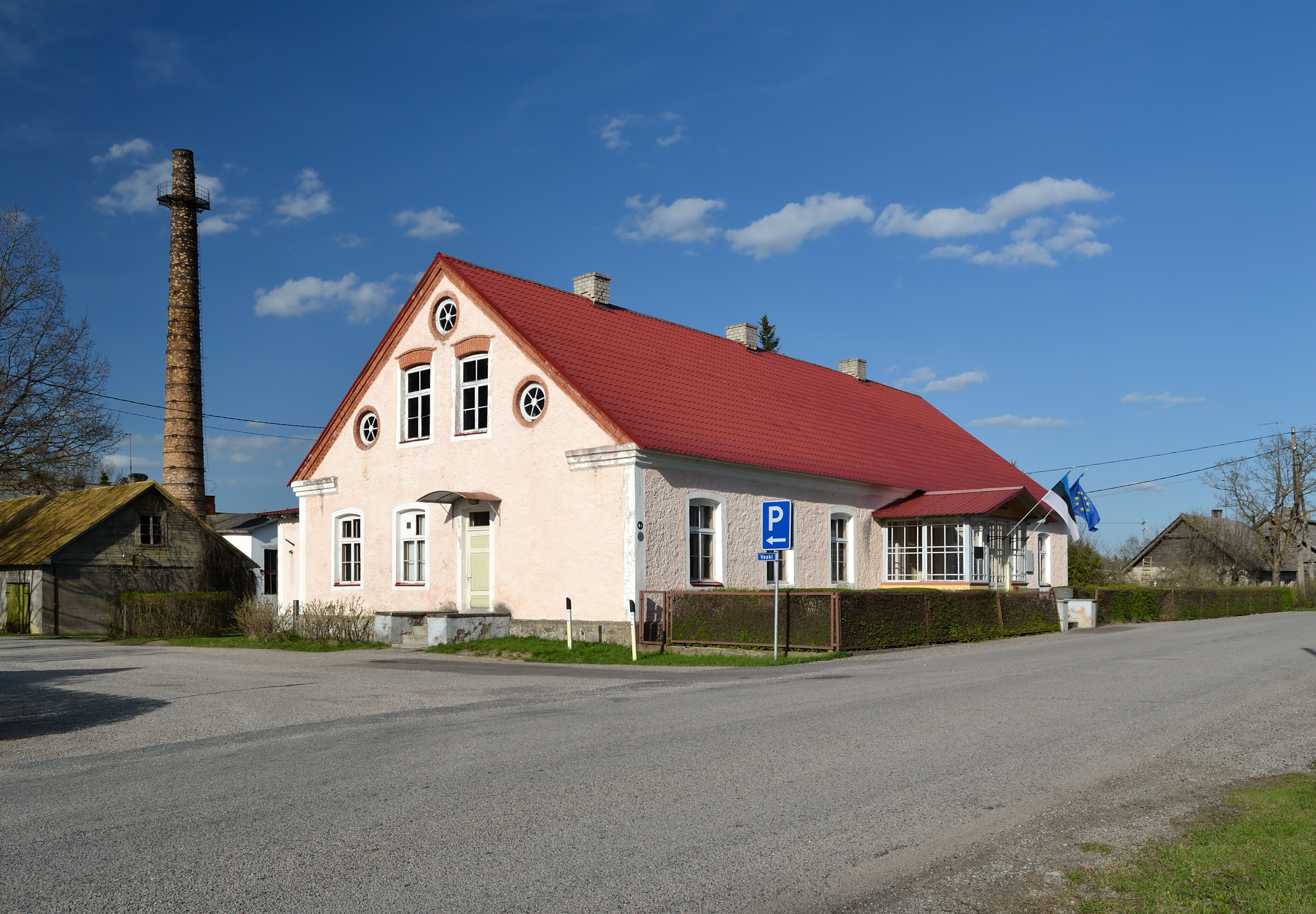
- Ambla Parish house

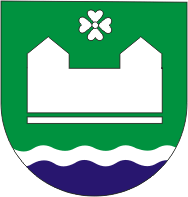
- Flag Coat of arms

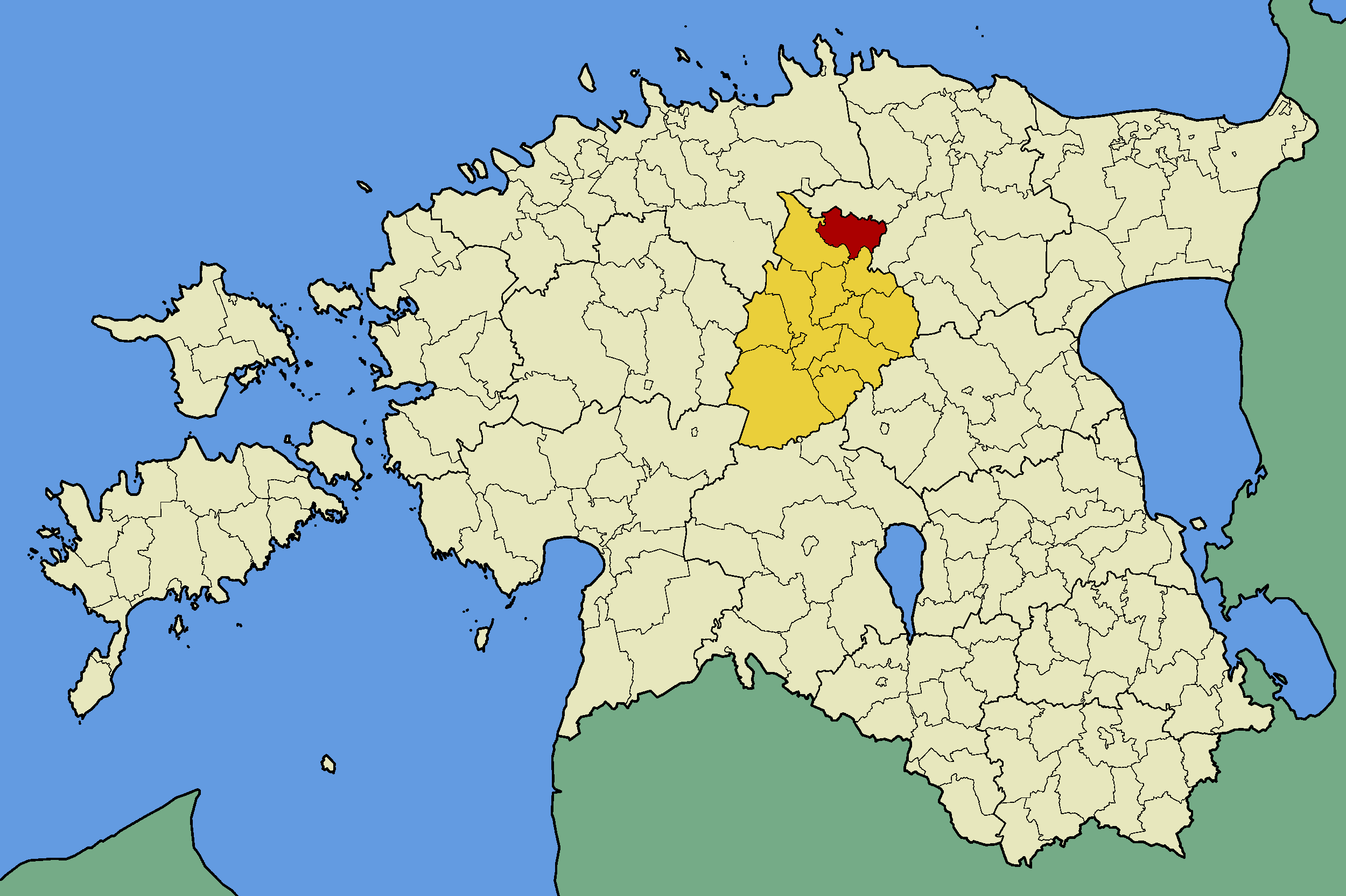
- Ambla Parish within Järva County.
- Country: Estonia
- County: Järva County
- Administrative centre: Ambla

Area
  - Total: 166 km^{2} (64 sq mi)

Population (2006)
  - Total: 2,423
  - Density: 14.6/km^{2} (37.8/sq mi)
- Website: www.ambla.ee

Ambla (Estonian: Ambla vald) was a rural municipality of Estonia, in Järva County. It had a population of 2,423 (2006) and an area of 166 km^{2} (64 sq mi).

== Populated places ==
=== Small boroughs ===
1. Aravete: 1,003
2. Ambla: 387
3. Käravete: 288

=== Villages ===
1. Roosna: 133
2. Jõgisoo: 111
3. Kurisoo: 107
4. Märjandi: 74
5. Sääsküla: 73
6. Reinevere: 68
7. Raka: 65
8. Kukevere: 49
9. Mägise: 35
10. Rava: 30
