= Vulbi Landscape Conservation Area =

Protected area in Estonia

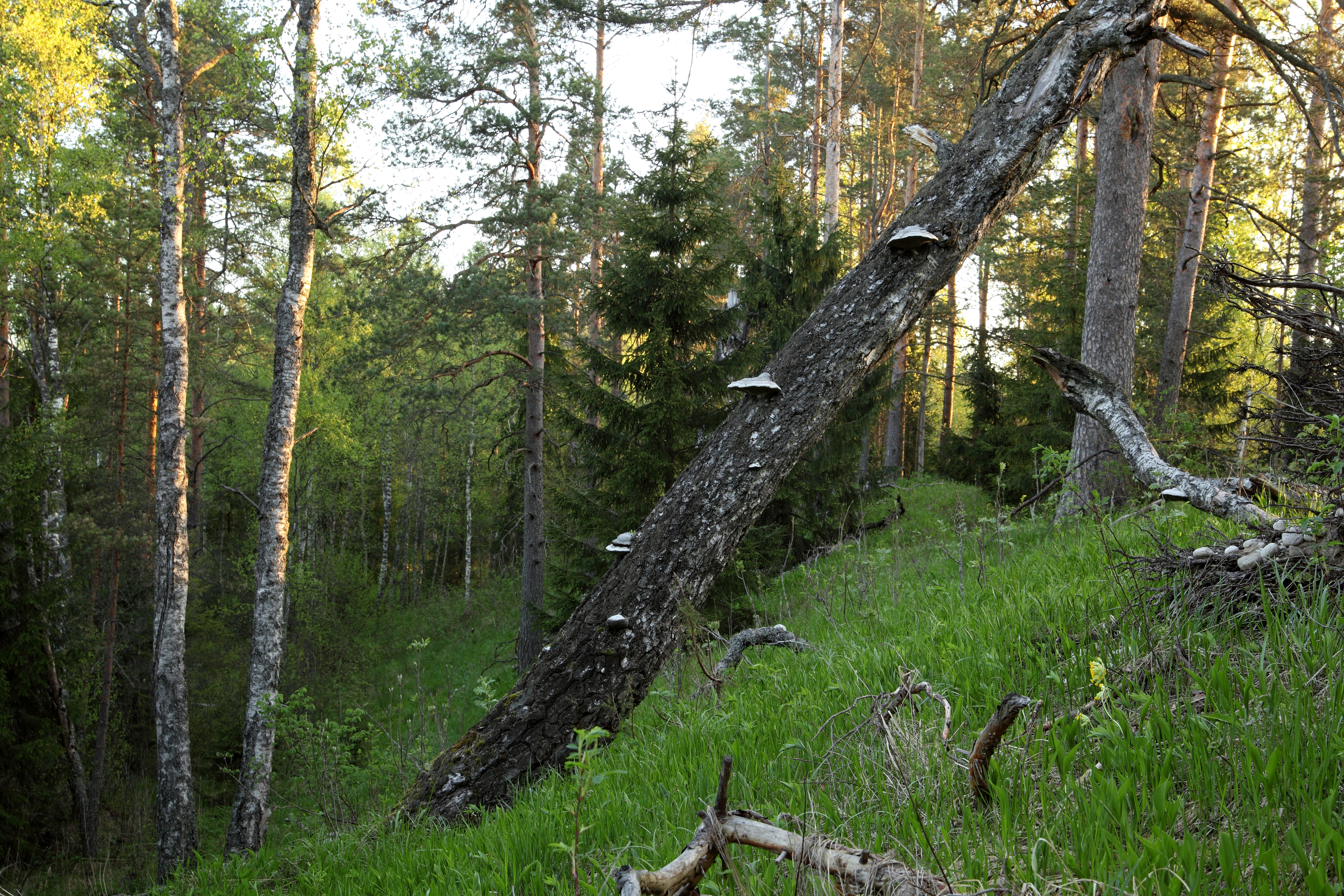

- Location within Estonia
- Location: Estonia
- Coordinates: 59°11′04″N 25°41′24″E
- Area: 11 ha (27 acres)
- Established: 1993 (2017)

Vulbi Landscape Conservation Area is a nature reserve situated in Järva County, Estonia.

Its area is 11 ha.

The protected area was designated in 1993 to protect esker areas in Albu and Ambla Parish. In 2017, the protected area was redesigned to the landscape conservation area.
