= Lehtmetsa =

Lehtmetsa may refer to several places in Estonia:

- Lehtmetsa, Harju County, village in Anija Parish, Harju County
- Lehtmetsa, Järva County, village in Järva Parish, Järva County
- Lehtmetsa, Pärnu County, village in Põhja-Pärnumaa Parish, Pärnu County
- Lehtmetsa, Saare County, village in Muhu Parish, Saare County

== See also ==
- Lehemetsa, village in Võru Parish, Võru County
