= Tarvasjõgi =

River in Estonia

Tarvasjõgi Mõnuvere
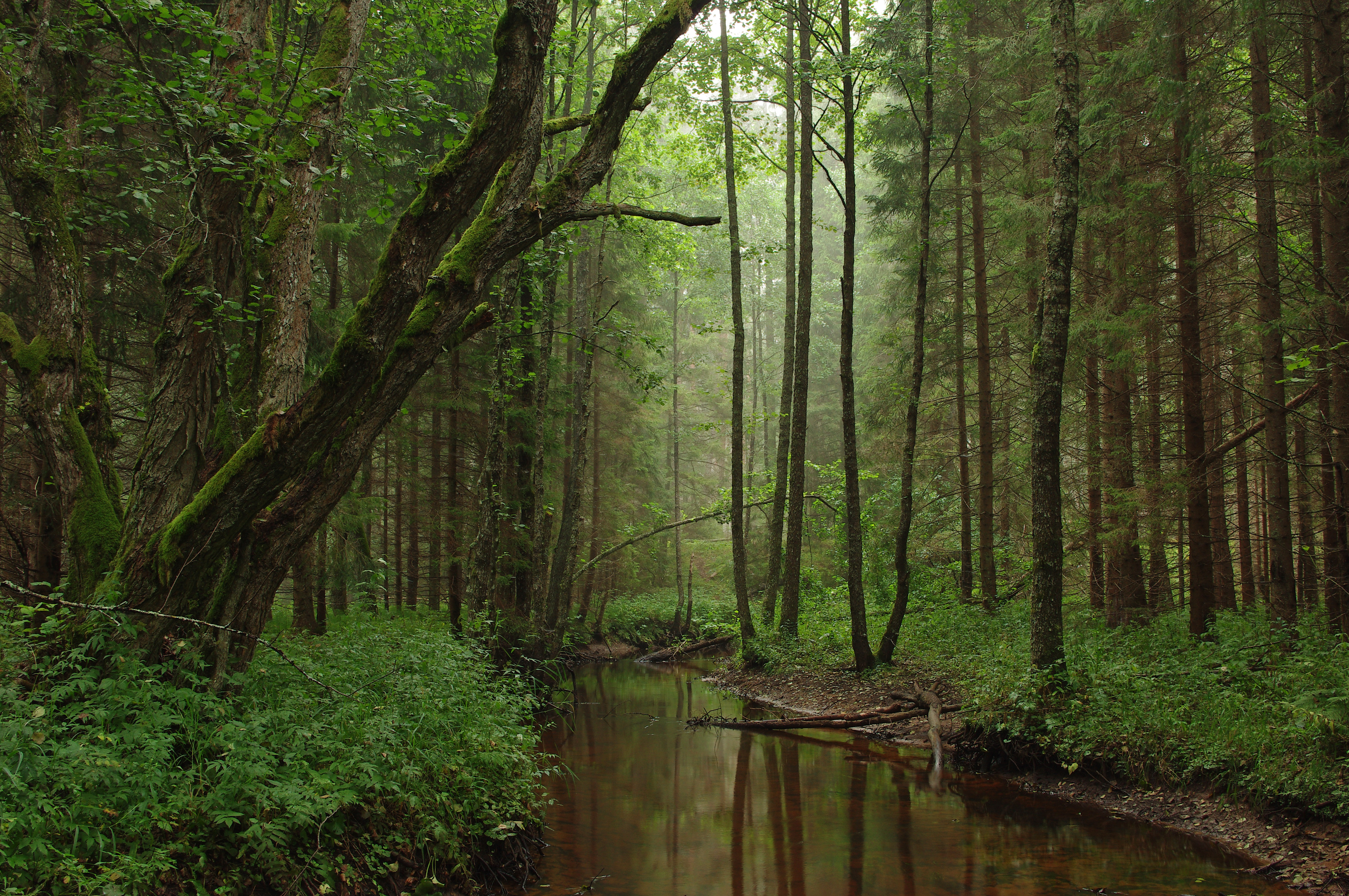
- The Tarvasjõgi flowing through Põhja-Kõrvemaa Nature Reserve

Location
- Country: Estonia

Physical characteristics
- Source
  - location: Peedu
  - coordinates: 59°12′2″N 25°38′51″E
- Mouth
  - location: Jäneda River
  - coordinates: 59°16′1″N 25°26′58″E
- Length: 30 km (19 mi)
- Basin size: 64.7 km^{2} (25.0 sq mi)

The Tarvasjõgi is a river in Estonia. It is also called the Mõnuvere (Estonian: Mõnuvere jõgi). It is a tributary of the Jäneda, which in turn flows into the Jägala and thence into the Baltic Sea. The Tarvasjõgi begins near the Piibe Highway (a historic road that connects Tallinn and Tartu). The river is 30 kilometres (19 mi) long and has a 64.7-square-kilometre (25.0 sq mi) drainage basin.

The river starts at Piibe Road, 5 km southwest of the village of Peedu. This place is located in the Lääne-Viru County, south of Jäneda and Kõrveküla in Tapa Parish. It flows south until it reaches Järva Parish in Järva County and then continues further southwest. In the village of Mõnuvere, it turns northwest and reaches Põhja-Kõrvemaa Nature Reserve, which it flows through for the rest of its course. At the point where it crosses the road between Jäneda and Alavere, it reaches the border of Harju County and continues as the border river between Järva and Harju counties. Shortly before its mouth, it enters Harju County, Anija Parish. After one kilometre, it joins the Jäneda, which in turn flows into the Jägala and thence the Baltic Sea.

Põhja-Kõrvemaa Nature Reserve, which the river flows through, is the third-largest nature reserve in Estonia, with an area of 131 km^{2} (51 mi^{2}). The scenery was formed by the retreat of the glaciers about 12,000 years ago. The land has extensive lakes, bogs, eskers, sand and gravel kames, fens, and heaths, with 40 percent forest cover. It provides a habitat for wolves, Eurasian lynx, and brown bears, and protected bird species include black storks, golden eagles, western capercaillies, and common cranes.

Gallery
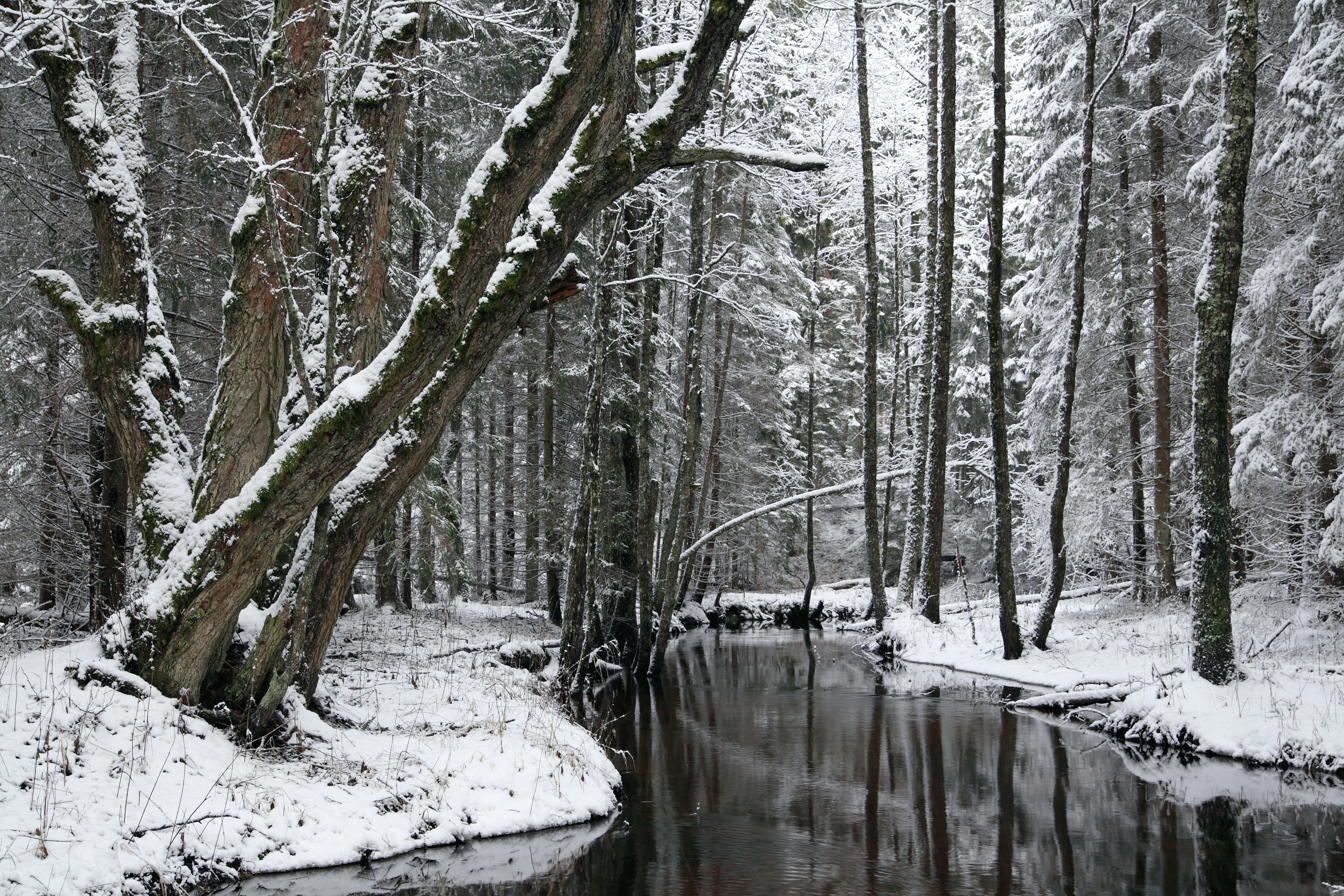

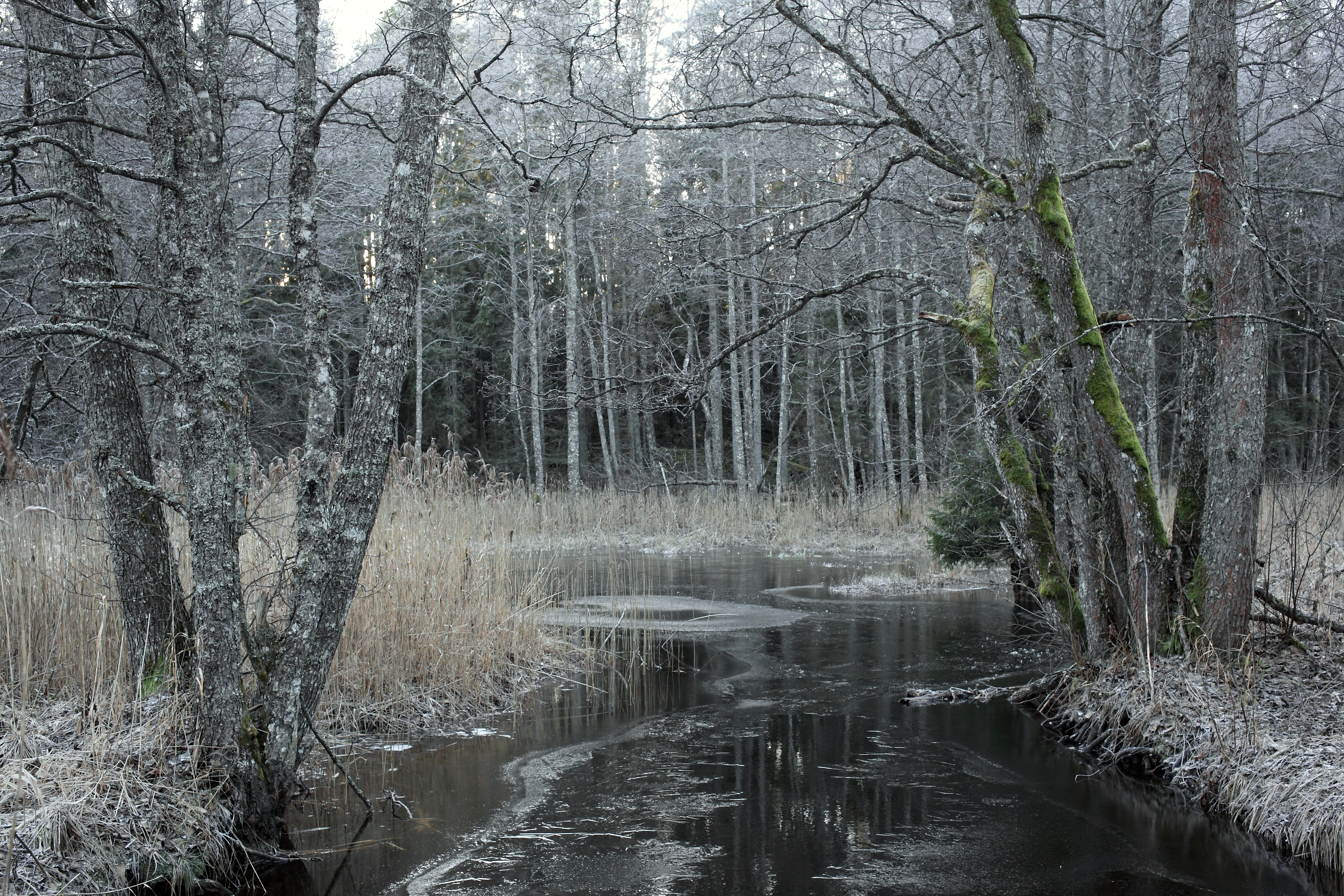

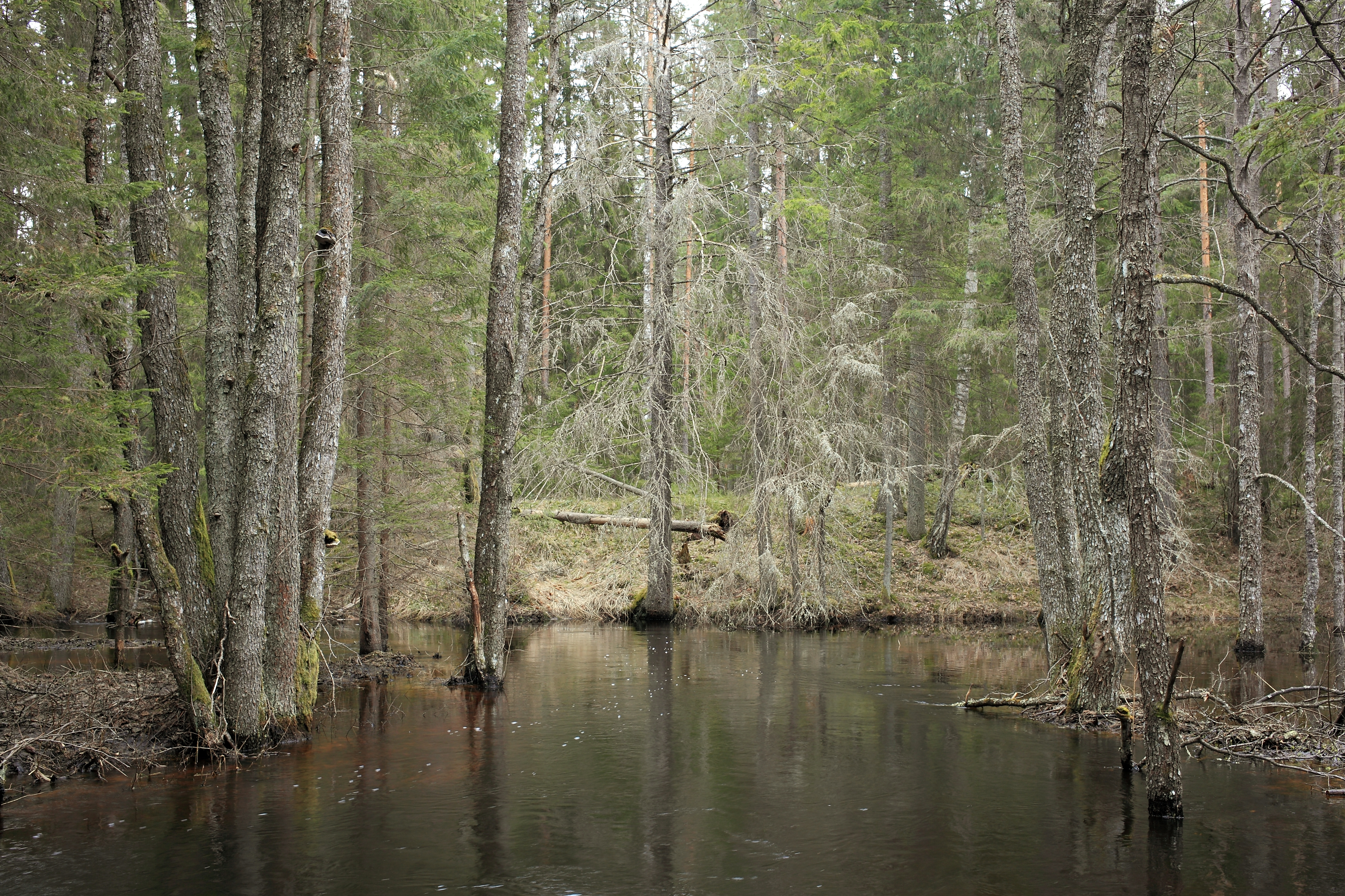
