= Jäneda (river) =

River in Estonia

Jänijõgi Jäneda jõgi
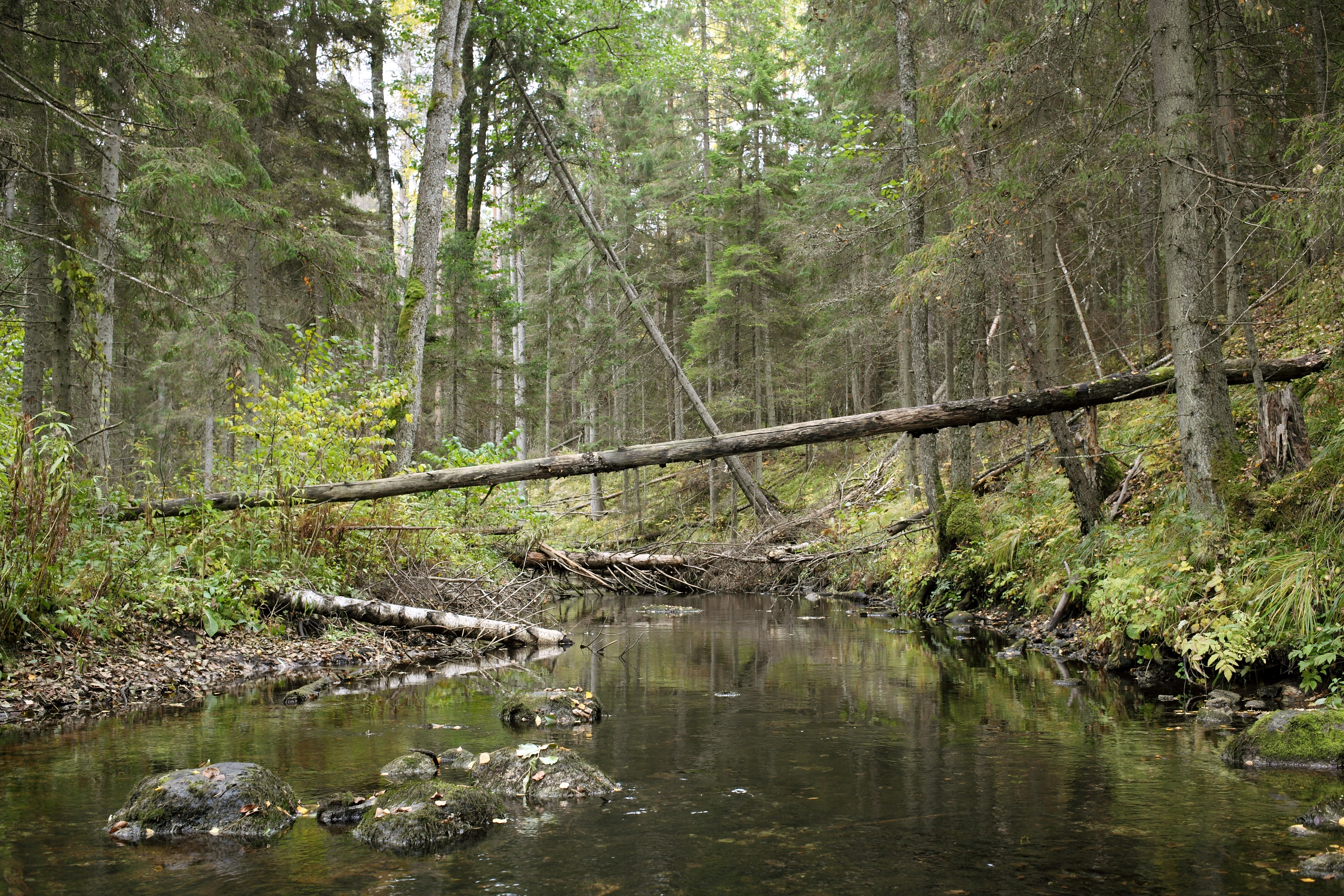
- Native name: Jänijõgi (Estonian)

Location
- Country: Estonia

Physical characteristics
- Source
  - location: Käravete
  - coordinates: 59.1917°N 25.7597°E
- Mouth
  - location: Jägala River
  - coordinates: 59°16′4″N 25°26′50″E
- Length: 31.5 km (19.6 mi)
- Basin size: 172 km^{2} (or 168 km^{2})

The Jänijõgi (Estonian: Jänijõgi, Jäneda jõgi) is a river in the Kõrvemaa region of Estonia. It is a right tributary of the Jägala River.

The Jänijõgi originates 5.5 kilometres (3.4 mi) west of Ambla, at the settlement of Käravete in Ambla Parish, 1.2 kilometers northwest of the crossroads, near the southeastern edge of the village of Kukevere. The upper reaches are wooded. The river passes through the village of Jäneda. Records going back to 1591 indicate that the Jäneda Mill on the river was in existence by then.

The river is 31.5 kilometres (19.6 mi) (or 28 kilometres, 17 mi) long, with a watershed basin area of 172 square kilometres (66 sq mi) (or 168 square kilometres, 65 sq mi).

The Tarvasjõgi is a tributary of the Jänijõgi.

Gallery
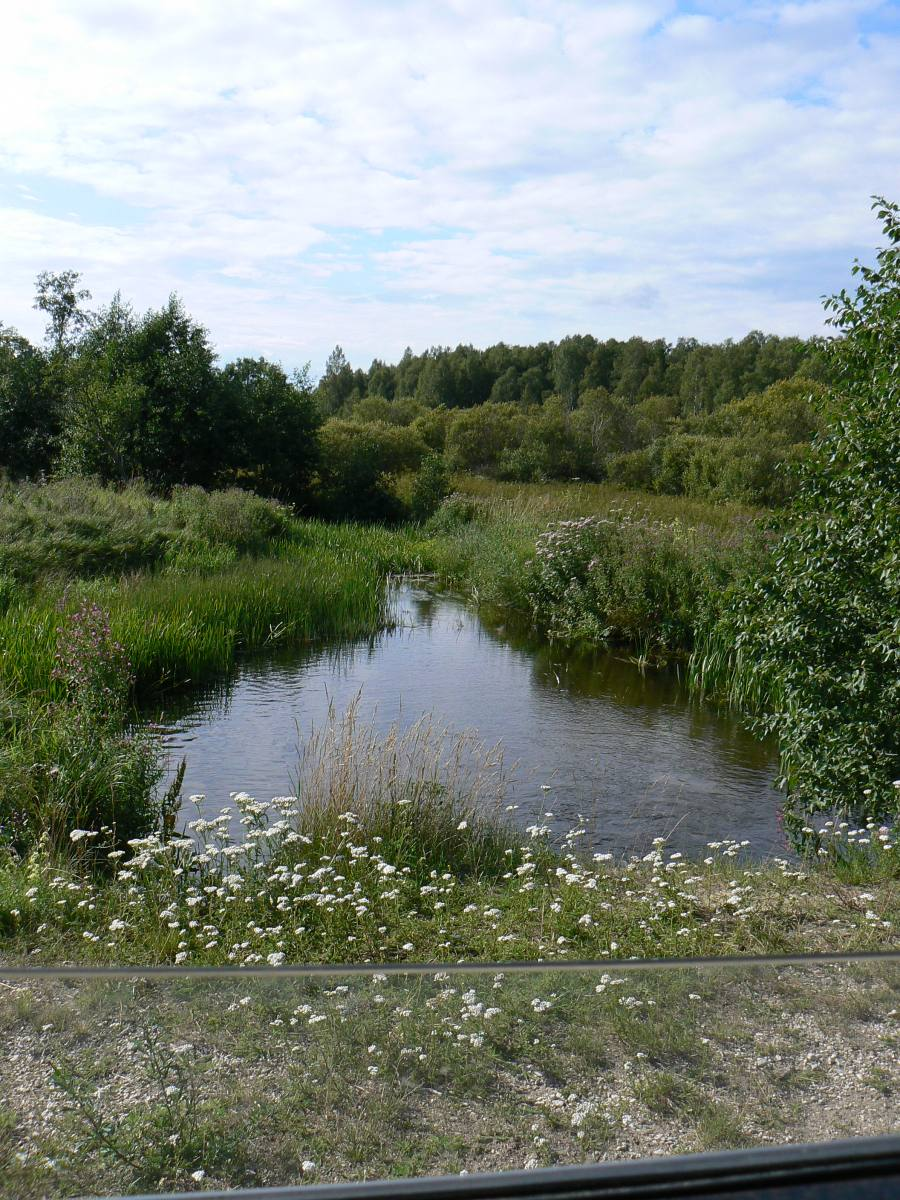

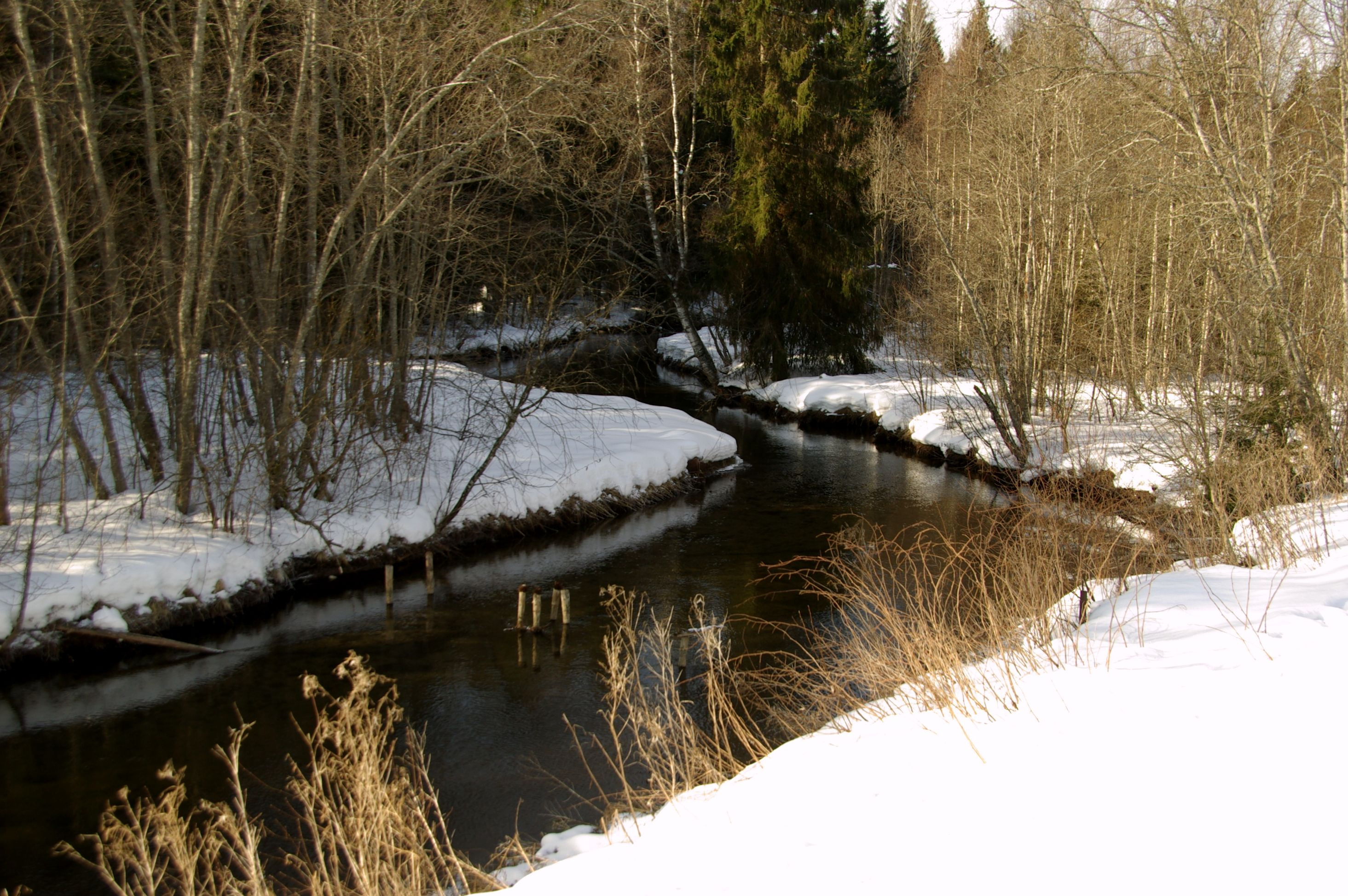

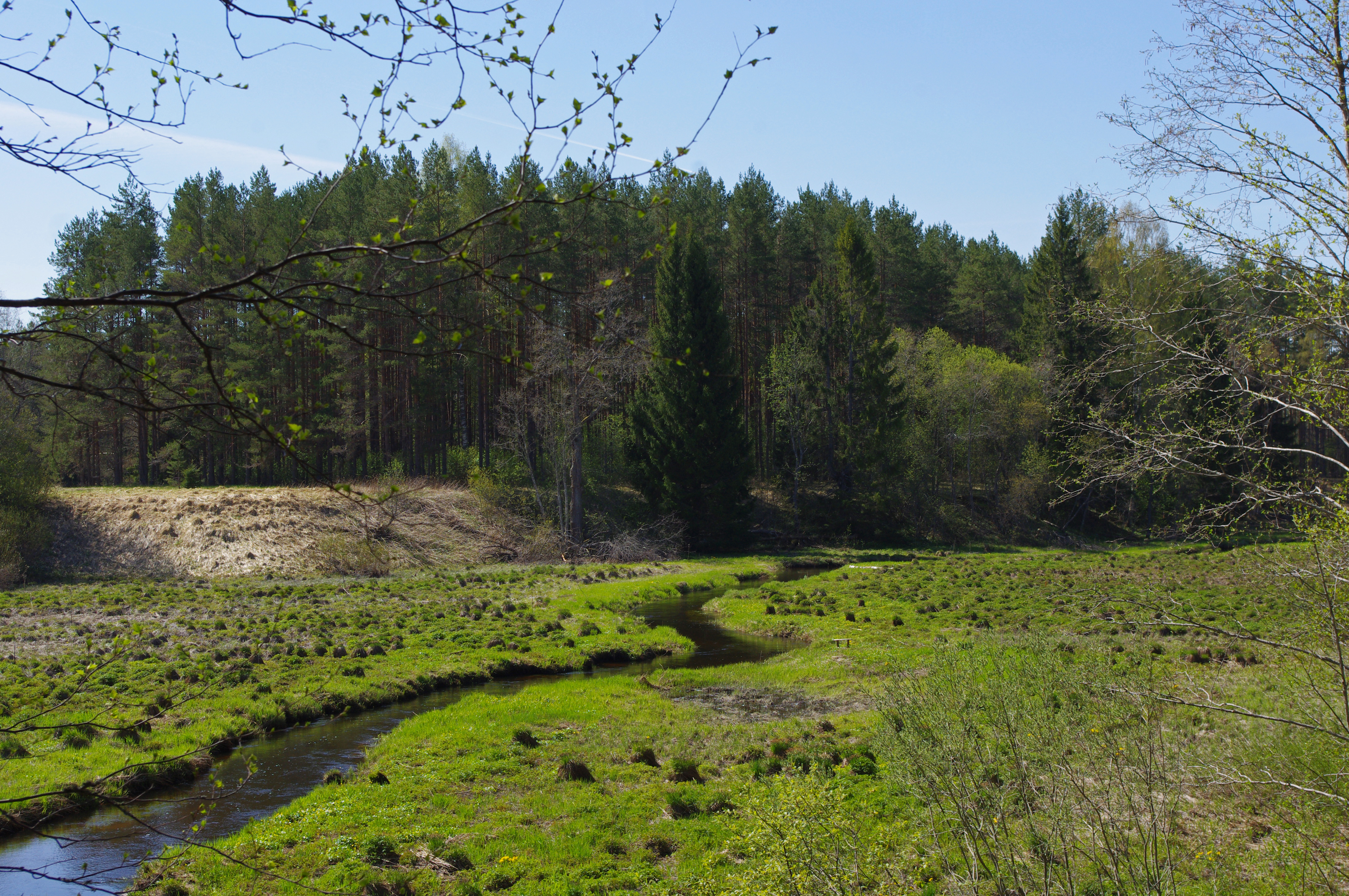
