= Sääsküla =

Sääsküla may refer to several places in Estonia:

- Sääsküla, Harju County, village in Kõue Parish, Harju County
- Sääsküla, Järva County, village in Ambla Parish, Järva County
- Sääsküla, Tartu County, village in Luunja Parish, Tartu County
