= Soosalu =

Soosalu may refer to several places in Estonia:

- Soosalu, Järva County, village in Albu Parish, Järva County
- Soosalu, Pärnu County, village in Halinga Parish, Pärnu County
- Soosalu, Rapla County, village in Märjamaa Parish, Rapla County
