= Jõgisoo =

Jõgisoo may refer to several places in Estonia:

- Jõgisoo, Harju County, village in Saue Parish, Harju County
- Jõgisoo, Järva County, village in Järva Parish, Järva County
- Jõgisoo, Lääne County, village in Lääne-Nigula Parish, Lääne County
