= Raka =

Raka may refer to:

== Places ==
- Raka, Burkina Faso
- Raka, Tibet
- Raka, Krško, a village in the Municipality of Krško, southeastern Slovenia
- Raka, Järva County, village in Ambla Parish, Järva County, Estonia
- Raka, Rapla County, village in Rapla Parish, Rapla County, Estonia
- Raqqa, a city in Syria

== Mythology and religion ==
- Raka'ah, one unit of Islamic prayer, or Salaa
- Raka (mythology), a deity in Cook Islands mythology
- Raka-maomao, a deity in Māori mythology
- Raka, in Hindu mythology, a wife of Dhata
- Raka, in the Ramayana, sister of Kaikasi

== Other uses ==
- Rajdhani College, University of Delhi, India
- Raka, an epic poem by Nicolaas Petrus van Wyk Louw
- Raka, a 2019 EP by Golden Features and the Presets
- Raka, a fictional villain in the 1960 Indian film Jis Desh Mein Ganga Behti Hai, played by Pran
- Raka, an antagonist in the 2019 Indian animated series Chacha Chaudhary
- Raka, a character in the 2024 American film Kingdom of the Planet of the Apes
- Gibran Rakabuming Raka, 14th vice president of Indonesia

== See also ==
- Rakah (disambiguation)
- Kate Challis RAKA Award
