= Lüsingu Landscape Conservation Area =

Protected area in Estonia

- Location within Estonia
- Location: Estonia
- Coordinates: 59°10′N 25°53′E
- Area: 109 ha (270 acres)
- Established: 2006

Lüsingu Landscape Conservation Area is a nature park is located in Järva County, Estonia.

Its area is 109 ha.

The protected area was founded in 2006 to protect versatile landscapes and karst areas in Ambla Parish.
