= Kurisoo Nature Reserve =

Protected area in Estonia

- Location within Estonia
- Location: Estonia
- Coordinates: 59°07′30″N 25°46′00″E
- Area: 47 ha (120 acres)
- Established: 2005

Kurisoo Nature Reserve is a nature reserve which is located in Järva County, Estonia.

The area of the nature reserve is 47 ha.

The protected area was founded in 2005 to protect valuable habitat types and threatened species in Kurisoo village (Ambla Parish).
