= Rava Landscape Conservation Area =

Protected area in Estonia

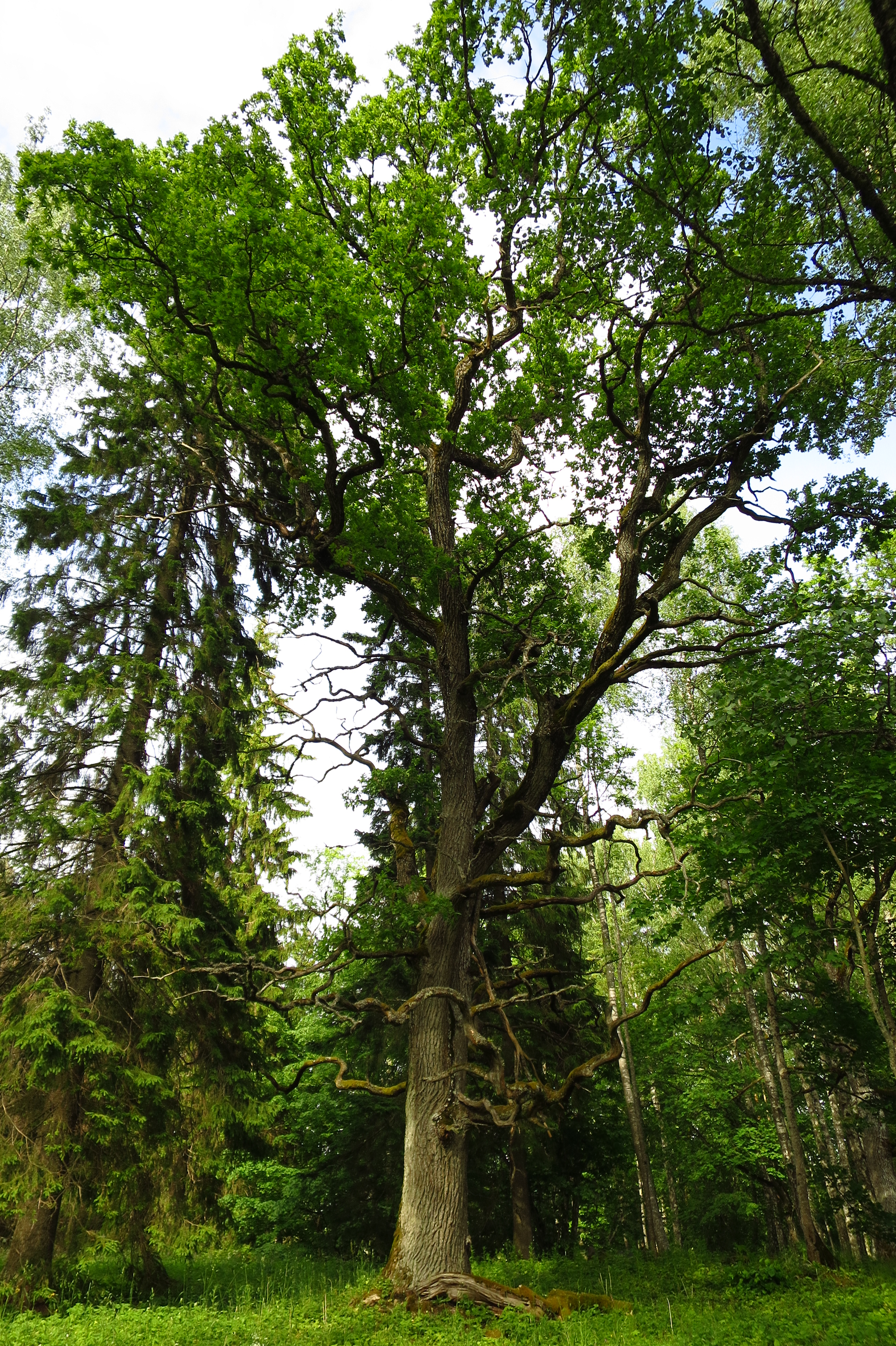

- Location within Estonia
- Location: Estonia
- Coordinates: 59°07′30″N 25°51′00″E
- Area: 16 ha (40 acres)
- Established: 1936 (2006)

Rava Landscape Conservation Area is a nature park which is located in Järva County, Estonia.

The area of the nature park is 16 ha.

The protected area was founded in 1936 to protect Rava Oak Forest and its surrounding areas. In 2006, the protected area was designated to the landscape conservation area.
