= Rakah =

Rakah may refer to:

- Maki, a communist party in Israel, formerly known as Rakah
- Raka'ah, one unit of Islamic prayer, or Salah

== See also ==
- Raka (disambiguation)
