= Järva-Madise =

Village in Estonia

Coordinates: 59°07′N 25°40′E

- Village
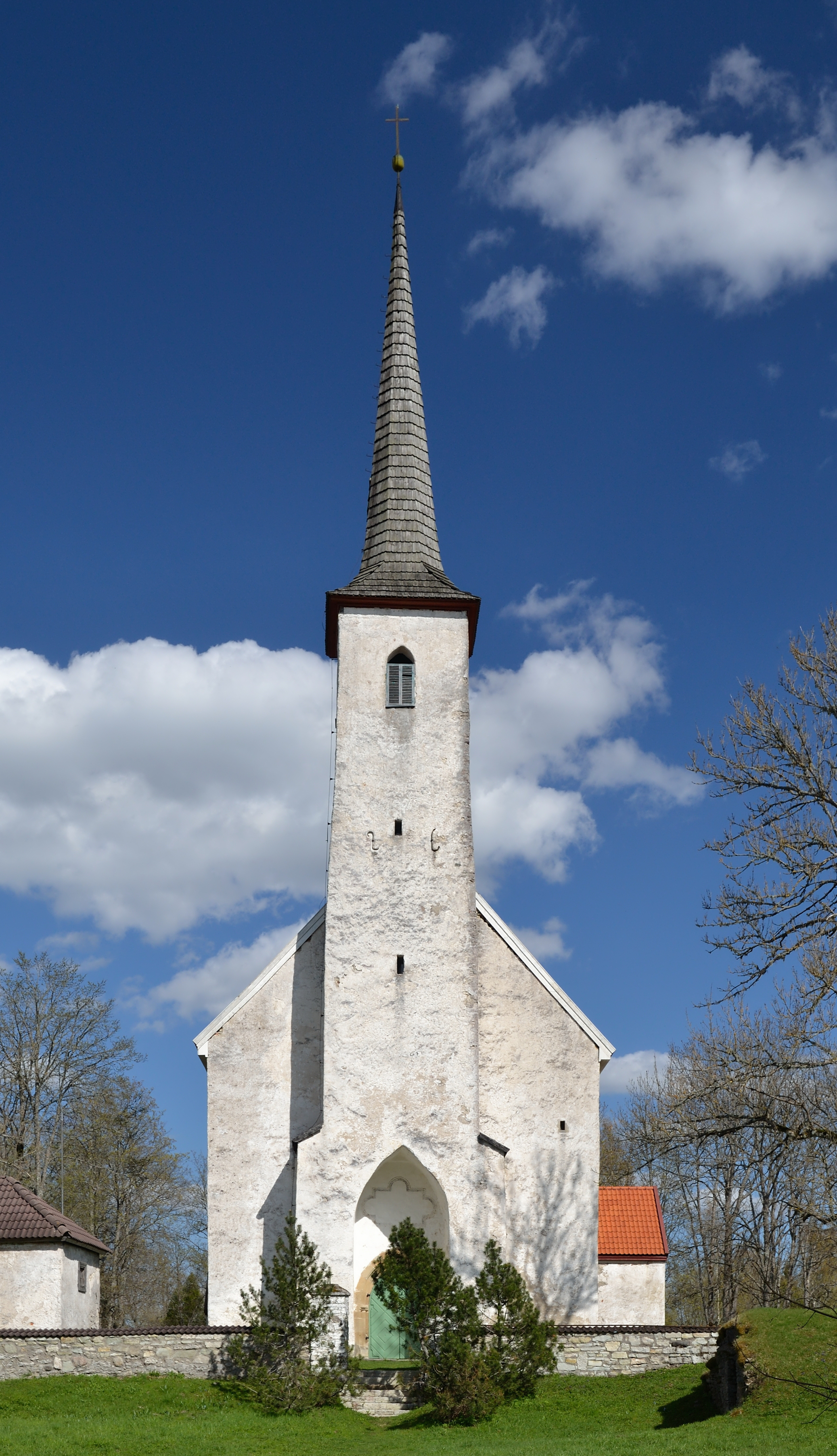
- Järva-Madise church
- Interactive map of Järva-Madise
- Country: Estonia
- County: Järva County
- Parish: Järva Parish
- Time zone: UTC+2 (EET)
  - Summer (DST): UTC+3 (EEST)

Järva-Madise (German: Sankt Matthäi) is a village in Järva County, in Järva Parish, in northern-central Estonia. It was the administrative centre of Albu Parish.
