= Reinevere =

Village in Estonia

Coordinates: 59°10′N 25°57′E

- Village
- Interactive map of Reinevere
- Country: Estonia
- County: Järva County
- Parish: Järva Parish
- Time zone: UTC+2 (EET)
  - Summer (DST): UTC+3 (EEST)

Reinevere is a village in Järva Parish, Järva County in northern-central Estonia.
