= Märjandi =

Village in Estonia

Coordinates: 59°10′N 25°47′E

- Village
- Interactive map of Märjandi
- Country: Estonia
- County: Järva County
- Parish: Järva Parish
- Time zone: UTC+2 (EET)
  - Summer (DST): UTC+3 (EEST)

Märjandi is a village in Järva Parish, Järva County in northern-central Estonia. It has a small population, in a 2021 consensus it was determined there are only 205 inhabitants.
