= Mägede =

Village in Estonia

Coordinates: 59°14′N 25°35′E

- Village
- Interactive map of Mägede
- Country: Estonia
- County: Järva County
- Parish: Järva Parish
- Time zone: UTC+2 (EET)
  - Summer (DST): UTC+3 (EEST)

Mägede is a village in Järva Parish, Järva County in northern-central Estonia.
