= Lehtmetsa, Saare County =

Village in Estonia

Coordinates: 58°37′20″N 23°19′22″E

Lehtmetsa
- Village
- Interactive map of Lehtmetsa
- Country: Estonia
- County: Saare County
- Parish: Muhu Parish
- Time zone: UTC+2 (EET)
  - Summer (DST): UTC+3 (EEST)

Lehtmetsa is a village in Muhu Parish, Saare County in western Estonia.
