= Aravete =

Borough in Estonia

- Small borough
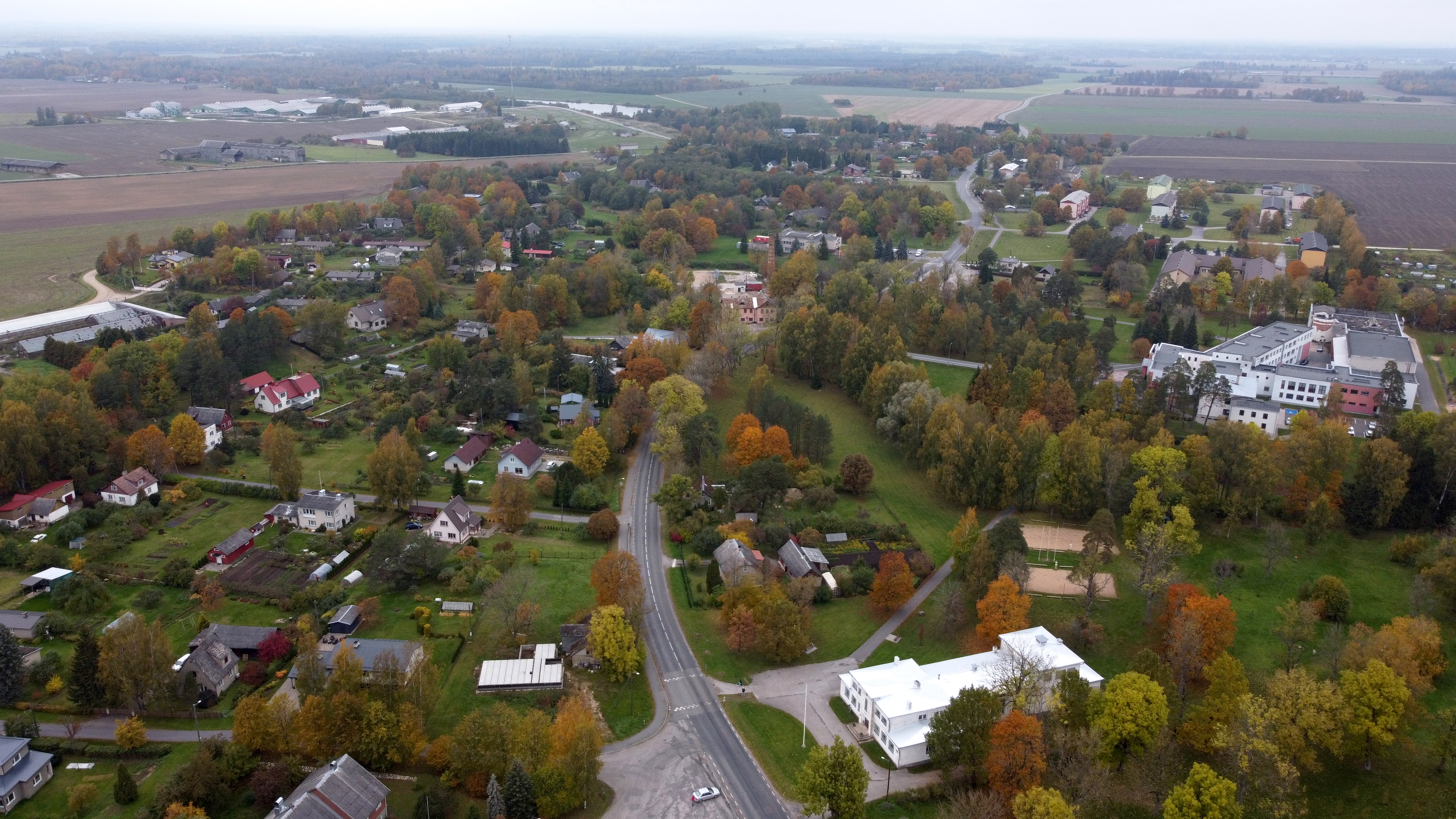
- Aerial view of Aravete

- Location in Estonia
- Coordinates: 59°8′30″N 25°45′41″E
- Country: Estonia
- County: Järva County
- Municipality: Järva Parish

Population (2011 Census)
  - Total: 769

Drone video of Aravete in October 2021

Aravete is a small borough (Estonian: alevik) in Järva Parish, Järva County, northern Estonia. As of the 2011 census, the settlement's population was 769.

== Gallery ==
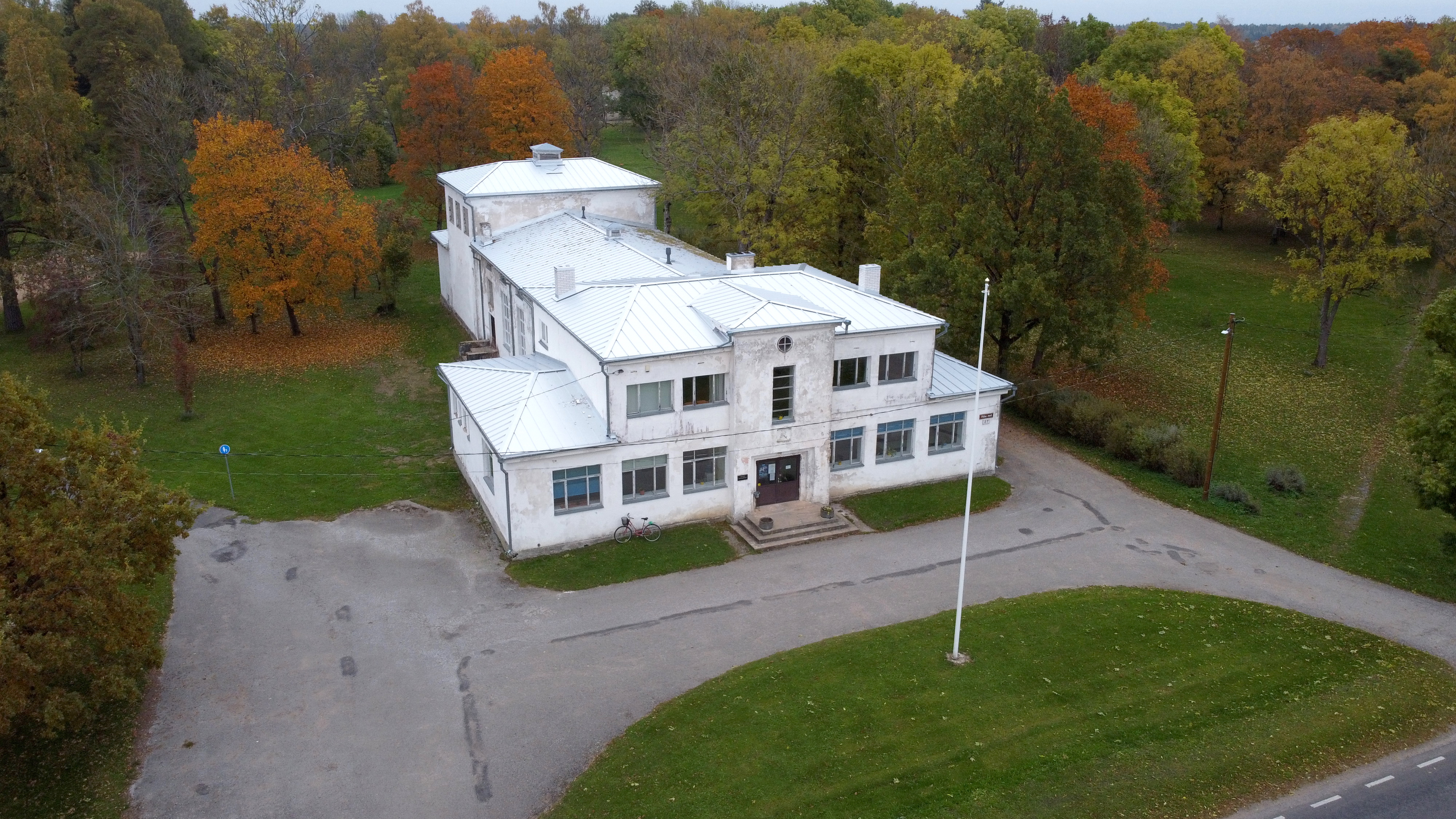
Aravete cultural house

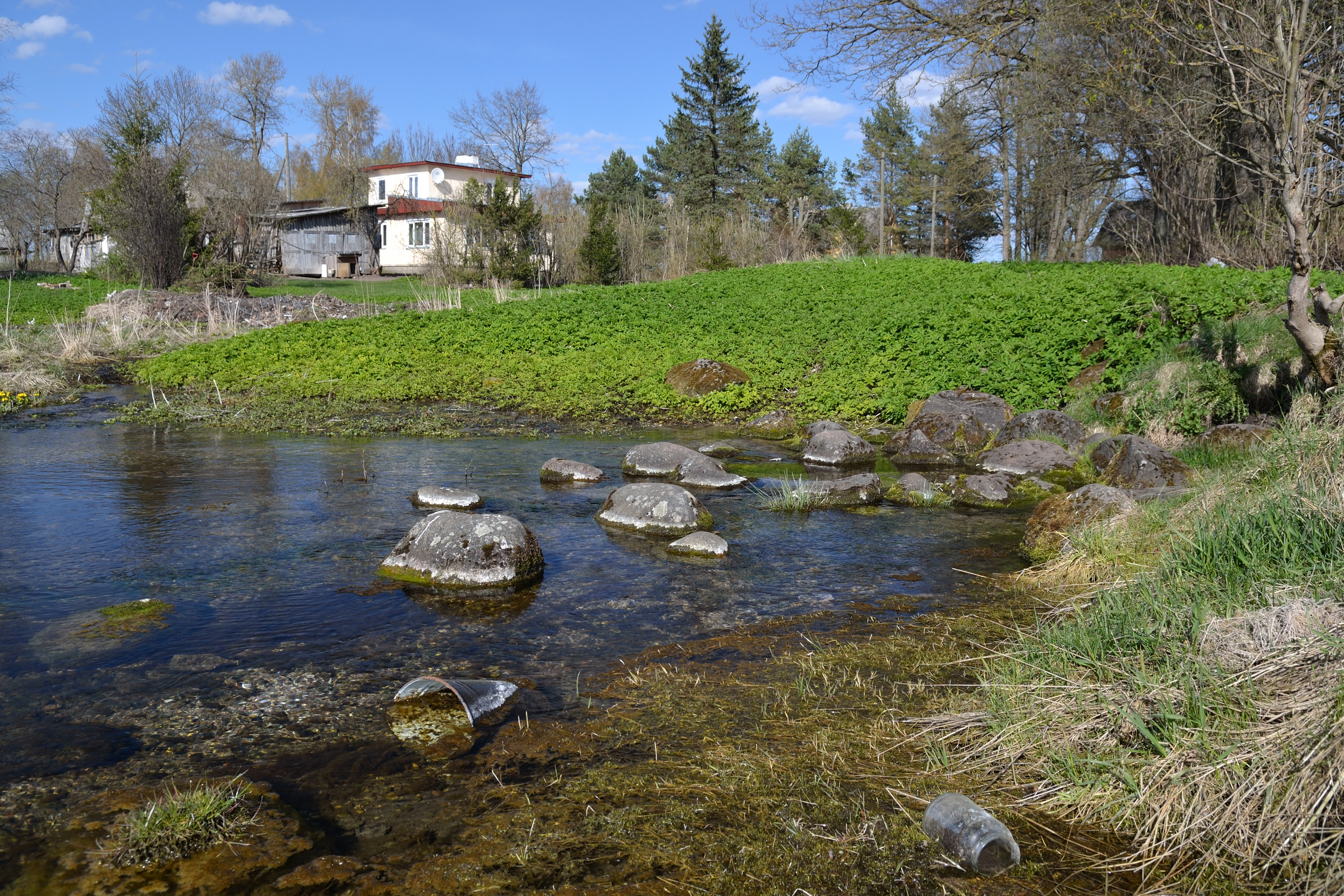
Aravete springs
