= Mägise =

Village in Estonia

Coordinates: 59°08′N 25°44′E

- Village
- Interactive map of Mägise
- Country: Estonia
- County: Järva County
- Parish: Järva Parish
- Time zone: UTC+2 (EET)
  - Summer (DST): UTC+3 (EEST)

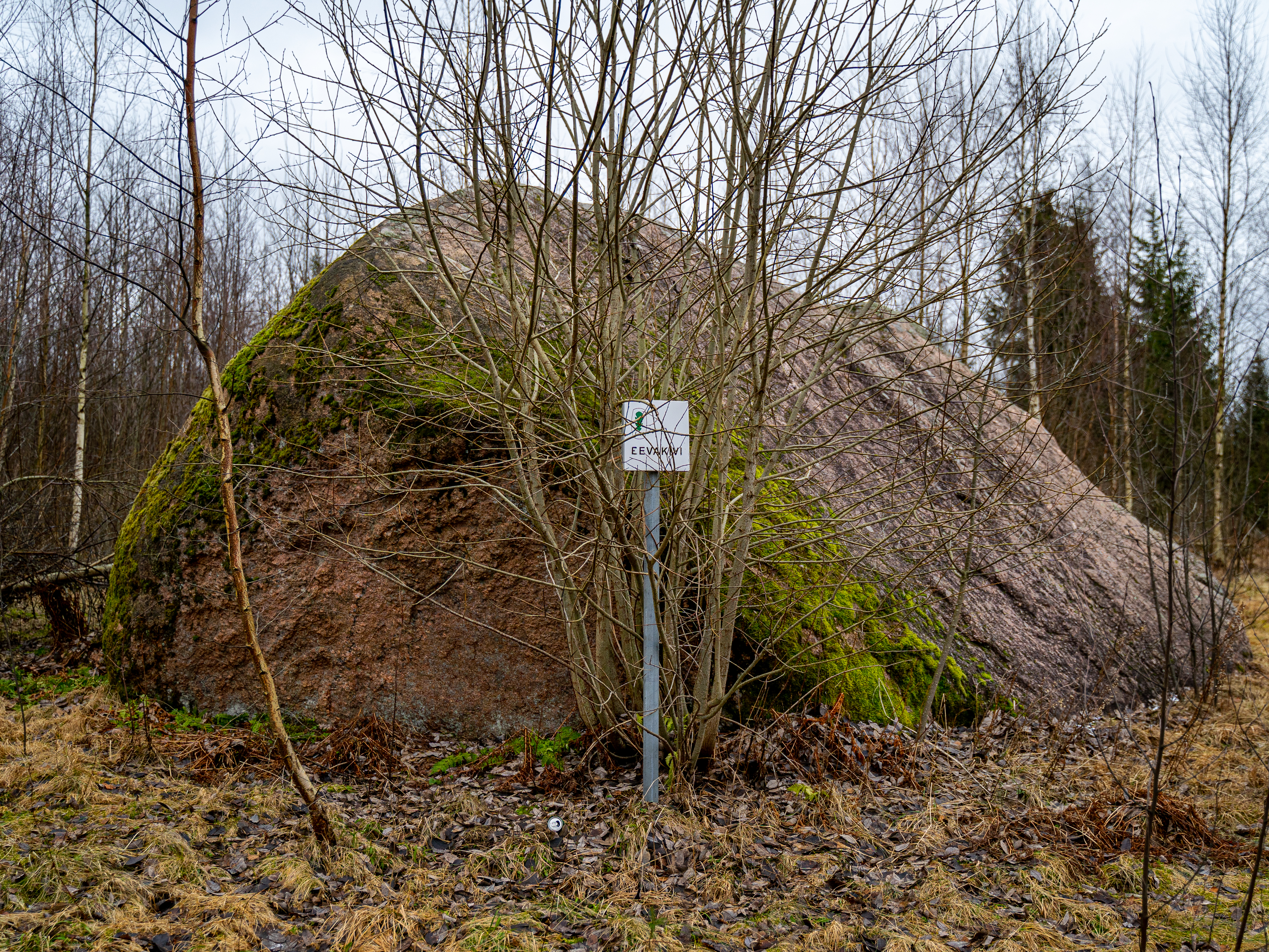
Eevakivi (also: Pullevere stone) is a giant boulder in Järva Parish, Järva County in northeastern Estonia

Mägise is a village in Järva Parish, Järva County in northern-central Estonia.
