= Orgmetsa =

Village in Estonia

Coordinates: 59°07′N 25°47′E

- Village
- Interactive map of Orgmetsa
- Country: Estonia
- County: Järva County
- Parish: Järva Parish
- Time zone: UTC+2 (EET)
  - Summer (DST): UTC+3 (EEST)

Orgmetsa is a village in Järva Parish, Järva County in northern-central Estonia.

Wooden Orgmetsa fire station was moved to Estonian Open Air Museum in Tallinn.

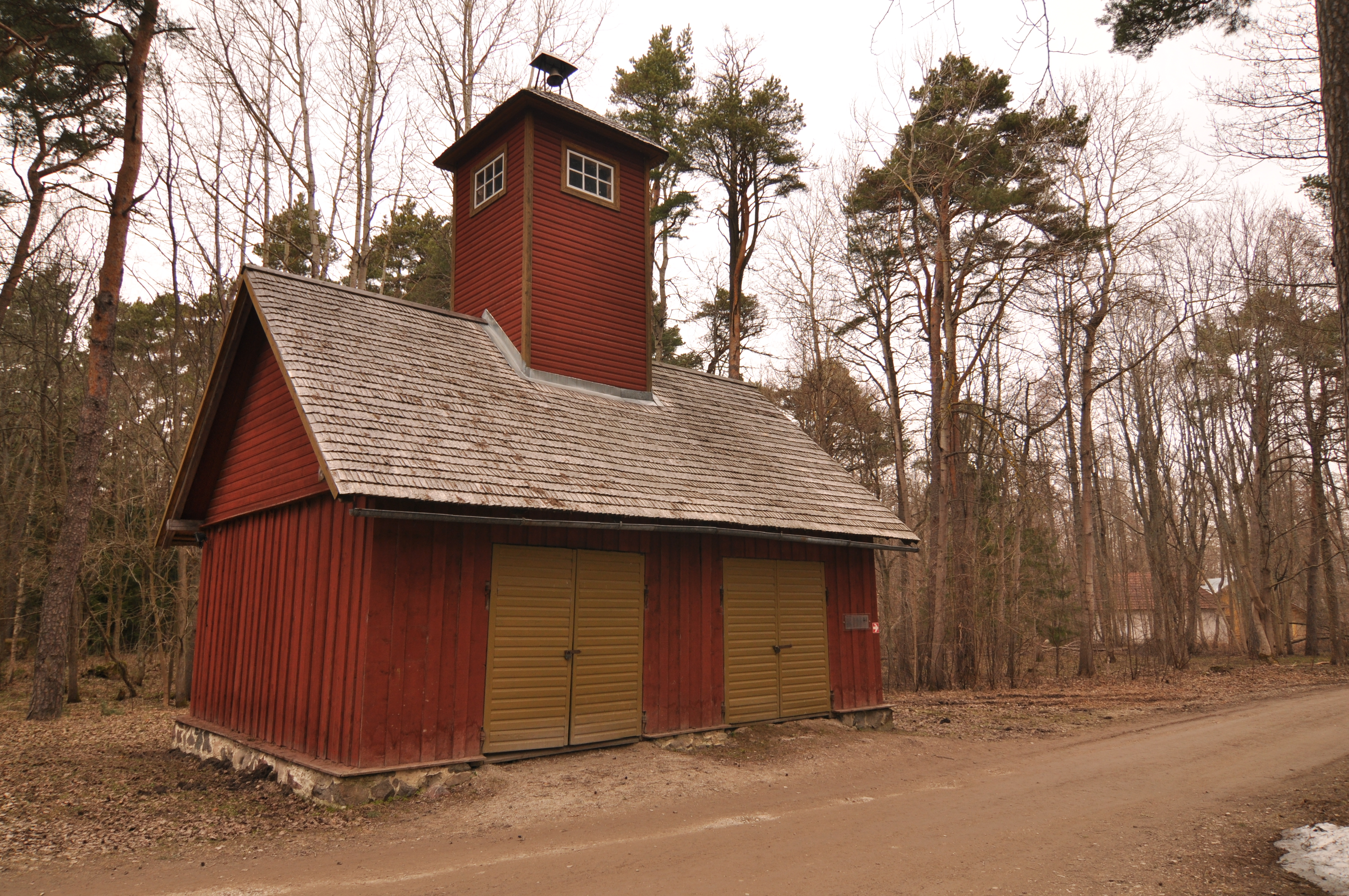
Orgmetsa fire station on its new location in Estonian Open Air Museum.
