= Soosalu, Järva County =

Village in Estonia

Coordinates: 59°10′43″N 25°37′26″E

Soosalu
- Village
- Interactive map of Soosalu
- Country: Estonia
- County: Järva County
- Parish: Järva Parish
- Time zone: UTC+2 (EET)
  - Summer (DST): UTC+3 (EEST)

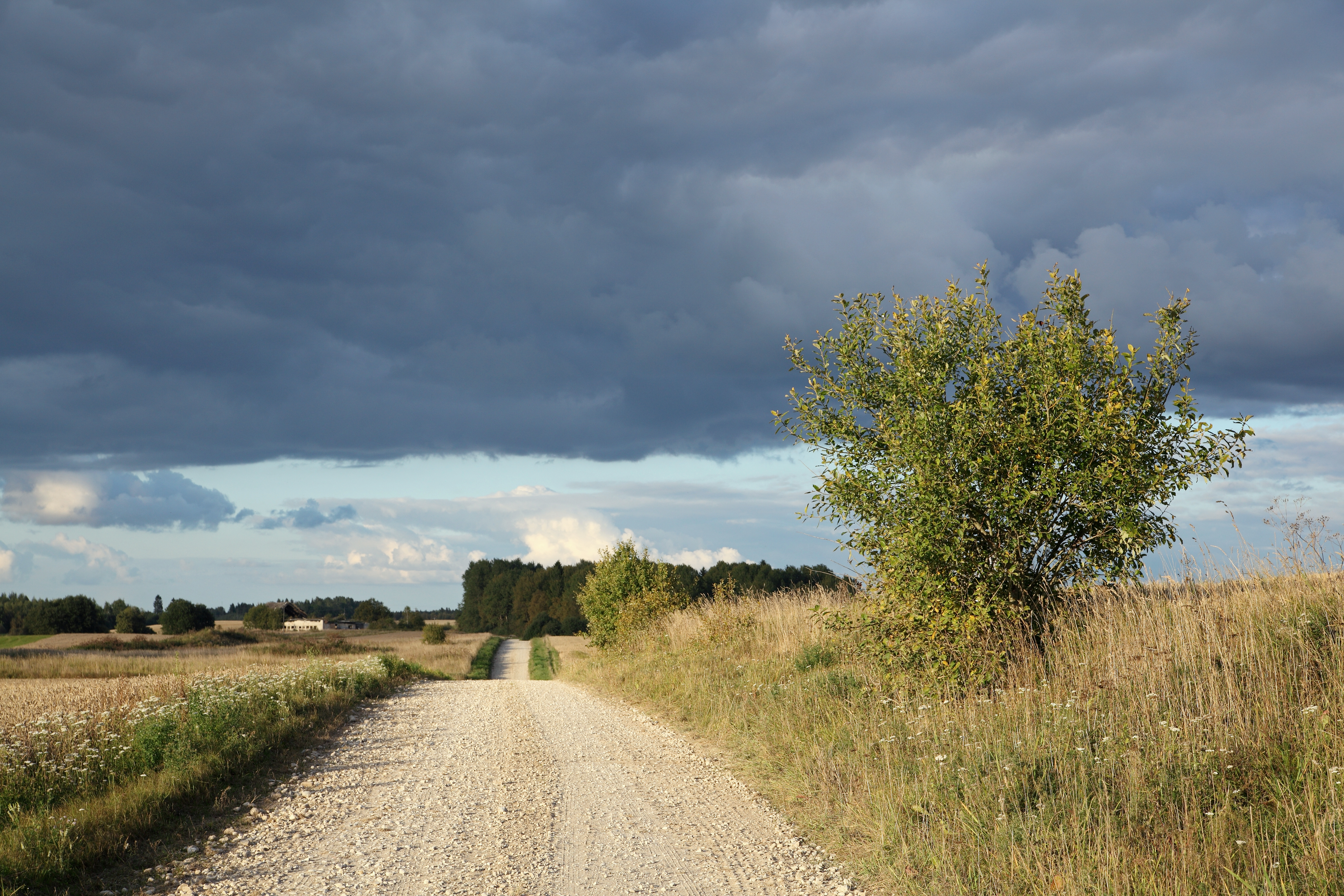
Soosalu Village in September, 2015.

Soosalu is a village in Järva Parish, Järva County in northern-central Estonia.
