= Raka, Järva County =

Village in Estonia

Coordinates: 59°09′47″N 25°49′41″E

Raka
- Village
- Interactive map of Raka
- Country: Estonia
- County: Järva County
- Parish: Järva Parish
- Time zone: UTC+2 (EET)
  - Summer (DST): UTC+3 (EEST)

Raka (German: Rakkamois) is a village in Järva Parish, Järva County in northern-central Estonia.
