= Lehtmetsa, Järva County =

Village in Estonia

Lehtmetsa
- Village
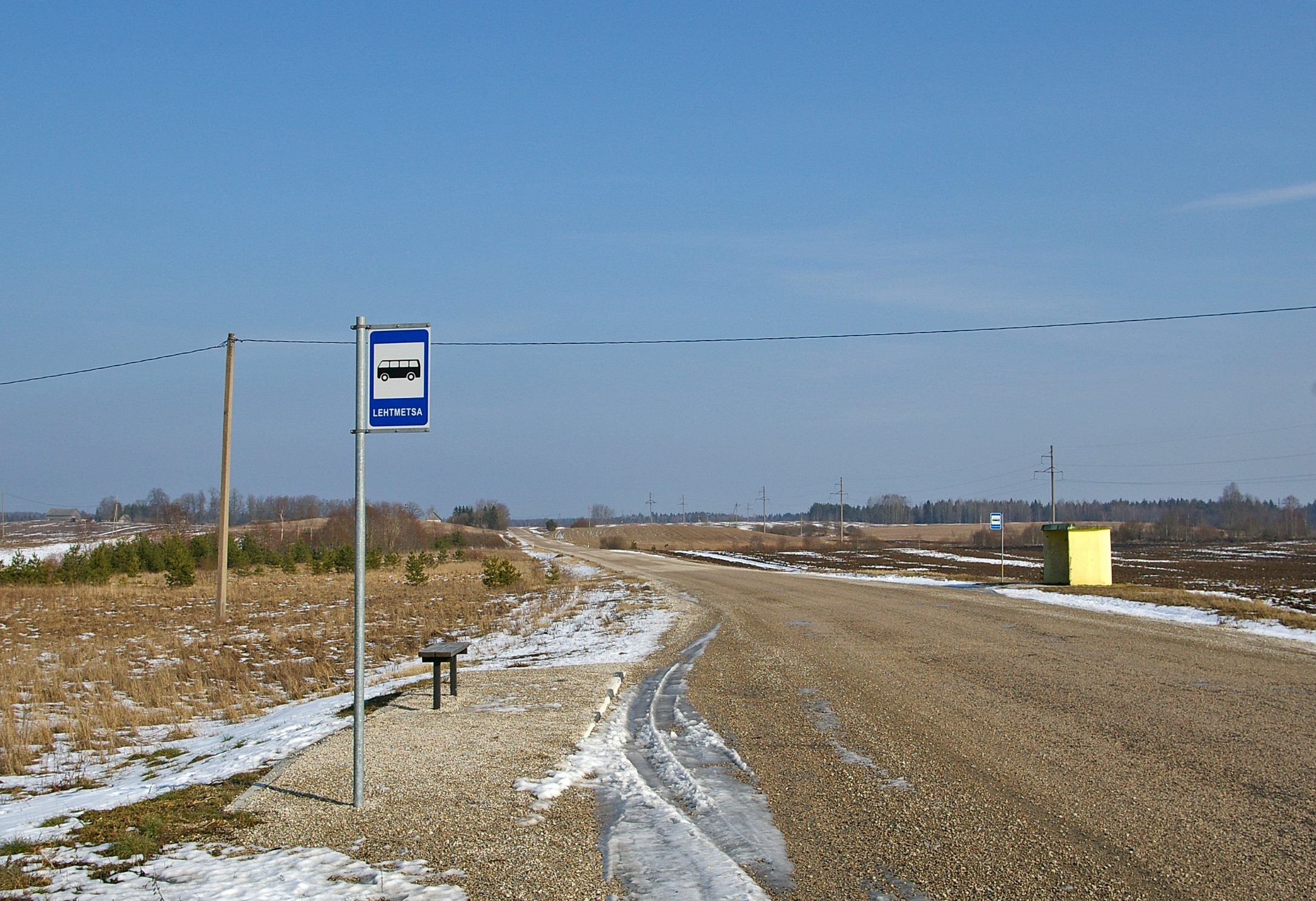
- Lehtmetsa bus stop

- Location in Estonia
- Coordinates: 59°12′40″N 25°35′47″E
- Country: Estonia
- County: Järva County
- Municipality: Järva Parish

Population (2011 Census)
  - Total: 39

Lehtmetsa is a village in Järva Parish, Järva County in Estonia. As of the 2011 census, the settlement's population was 39.
