= Kurisoo =

Village in Estonia

Coordinates: 59°08′38″N 25°46′25″E

- Village
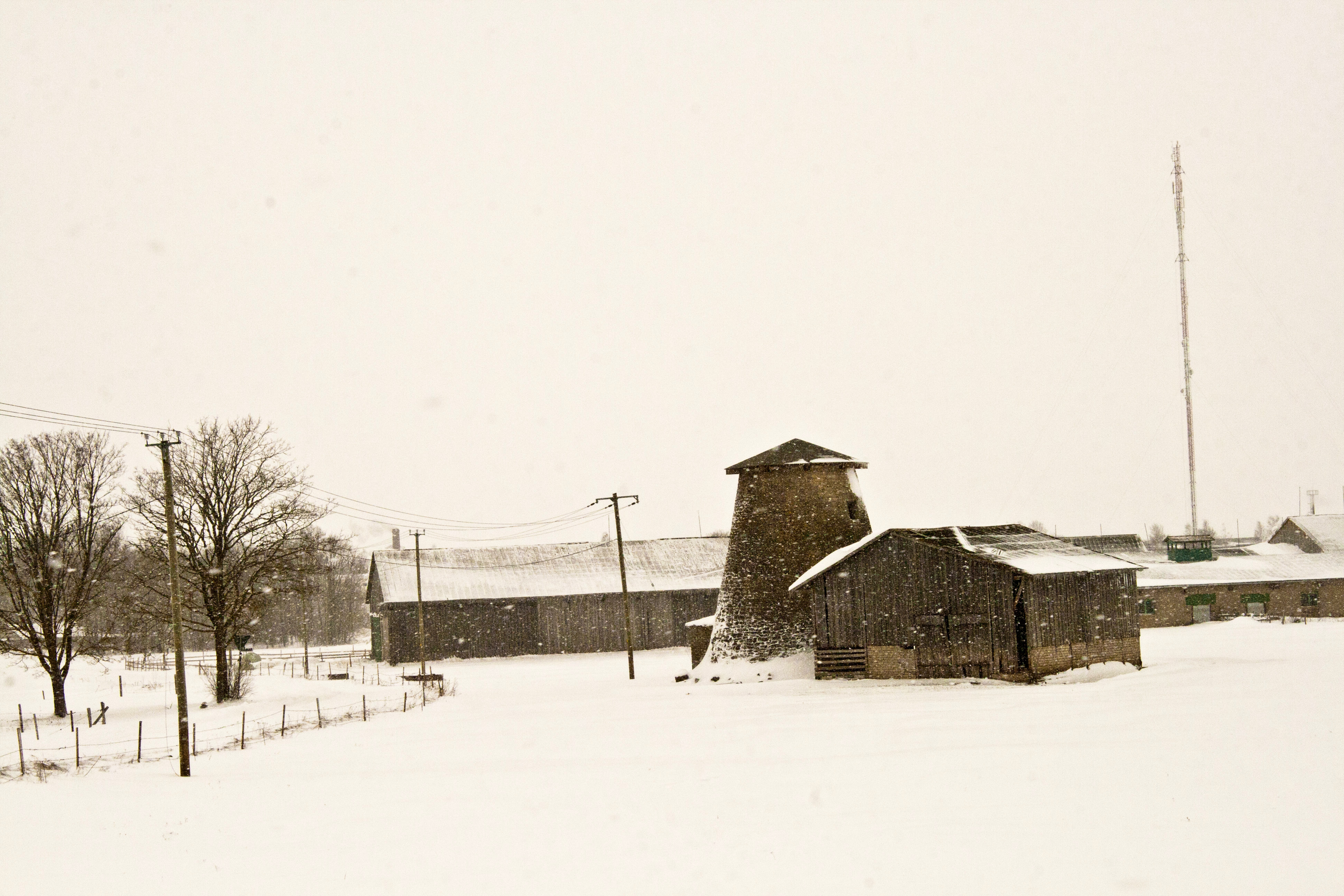
- Kurisoo manor windmill
- Interactive map of Kurisoo
- Country: Estonia
- County: Järva County
- Parish: Järva Parish
- Time zone: UTC+2 (EET)
  - Summer (DST): UTC+3 (EEST)

Kurisoo (German: Kurrisal) is a village in Järva Parish, Järva County in northern-central Estonia.
