= Rava, Järva County =

Village in Estonia

Coordinates: 59°07′22″N 25°50′51″E

Rava
- Village
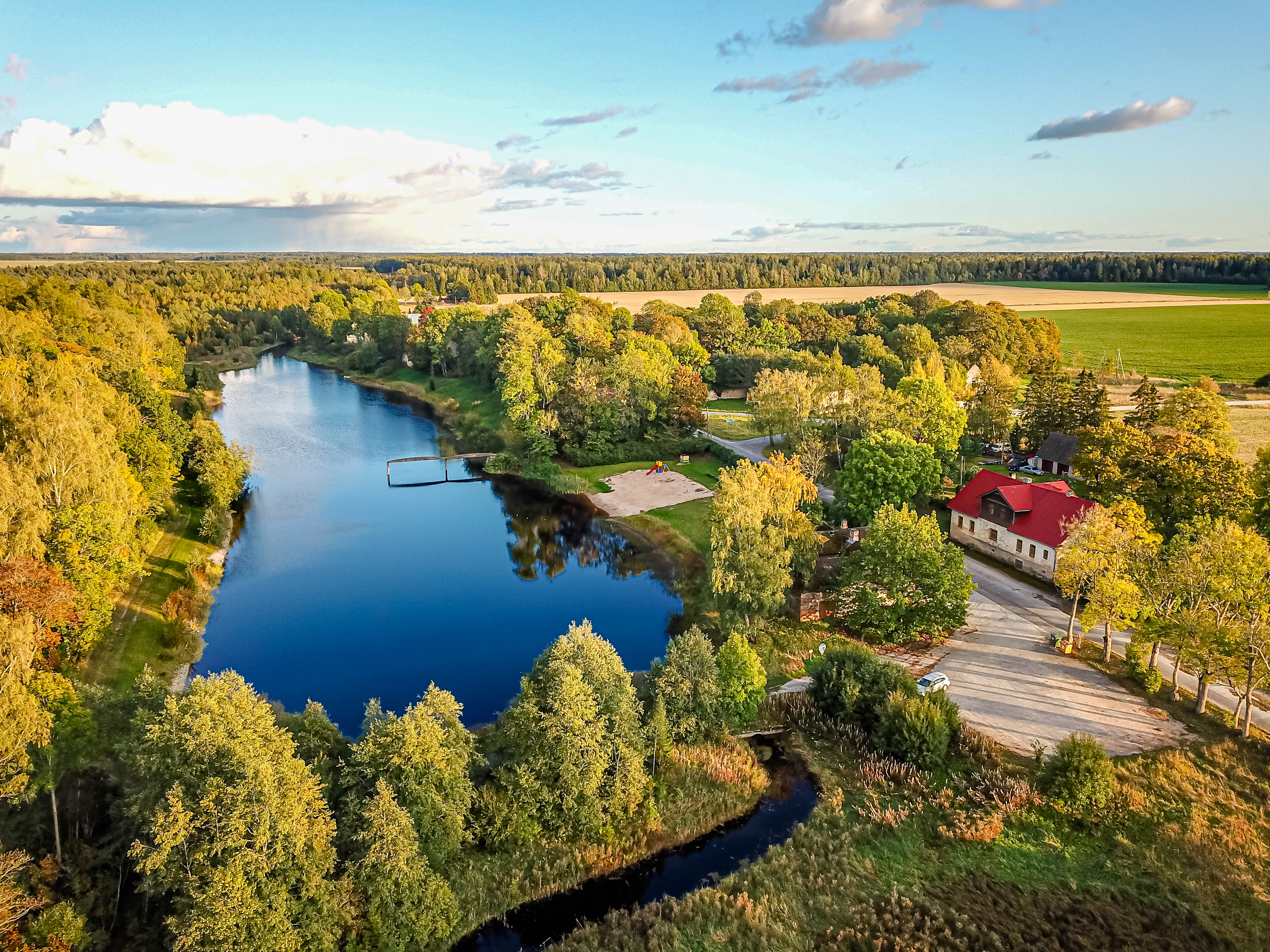
- Rava Reservoir
- Interactive map of Rava
- Country: Estonia
- County: Järva County
- Parish: Järva Parish
- Time zone: UTC+2 (EET)
  - Summer (DST): UTC+3 (EEST)

Rava (German: Rawwaküll) is a village in Järva Parish, Järva County in northern-central Estonia.
