= Sääsküla, Järva County =

Village in Estonia

Coordinates: 59°09′40″N 25°42′16″E

Sääsküla
- Village
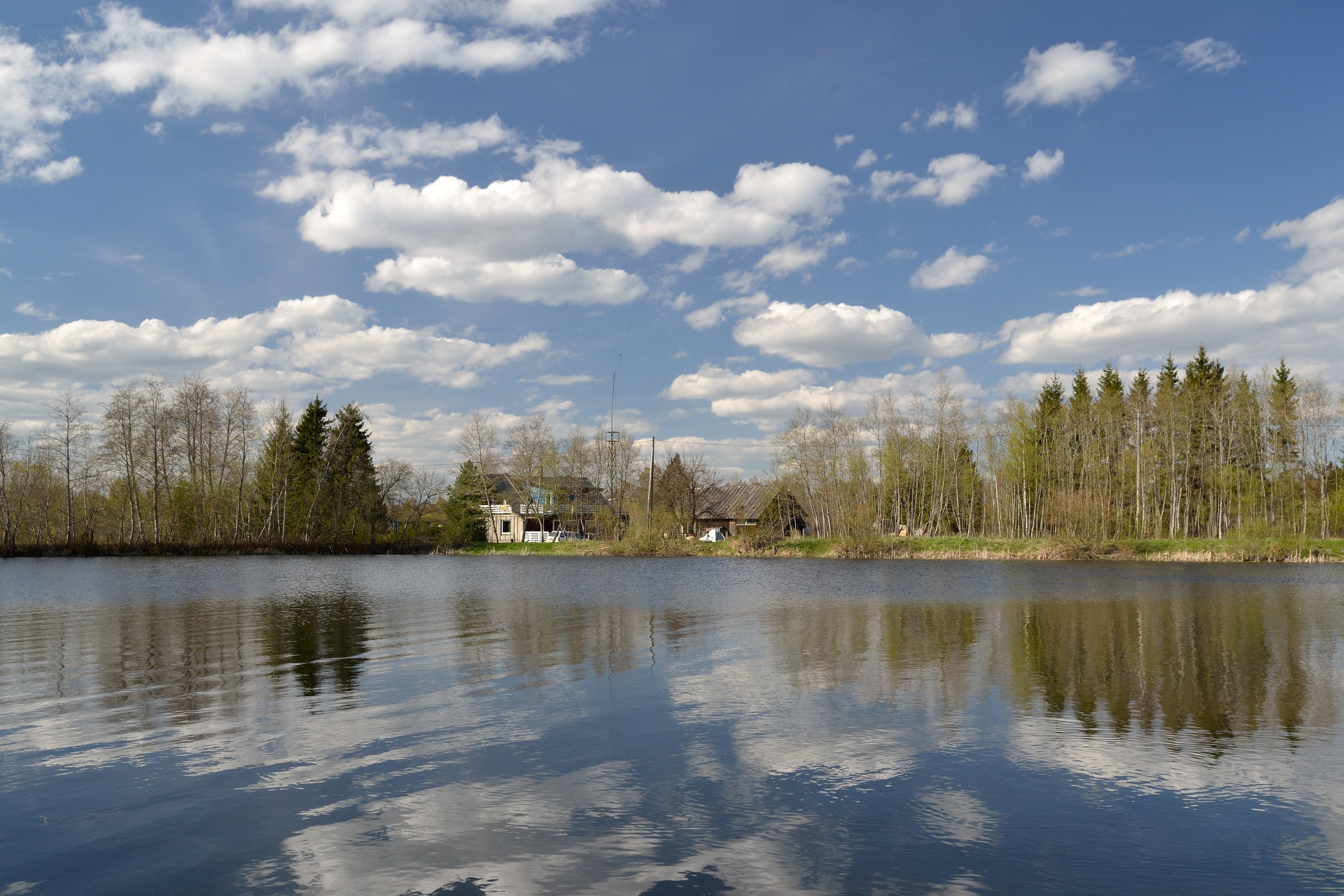
- Interactive map of Sääsküla
- Country: Estonia
- County: Järva County
- Parish: Järva Parish
- Time zone: UTC+2 (EET)
  - Summer (DST): UTC+3 (EEST)

Sääsküla is a village in Järva Parish, Järva County in north-central Estonia.
