= Ülgase Nature Reserve =

Protected area in Estonia

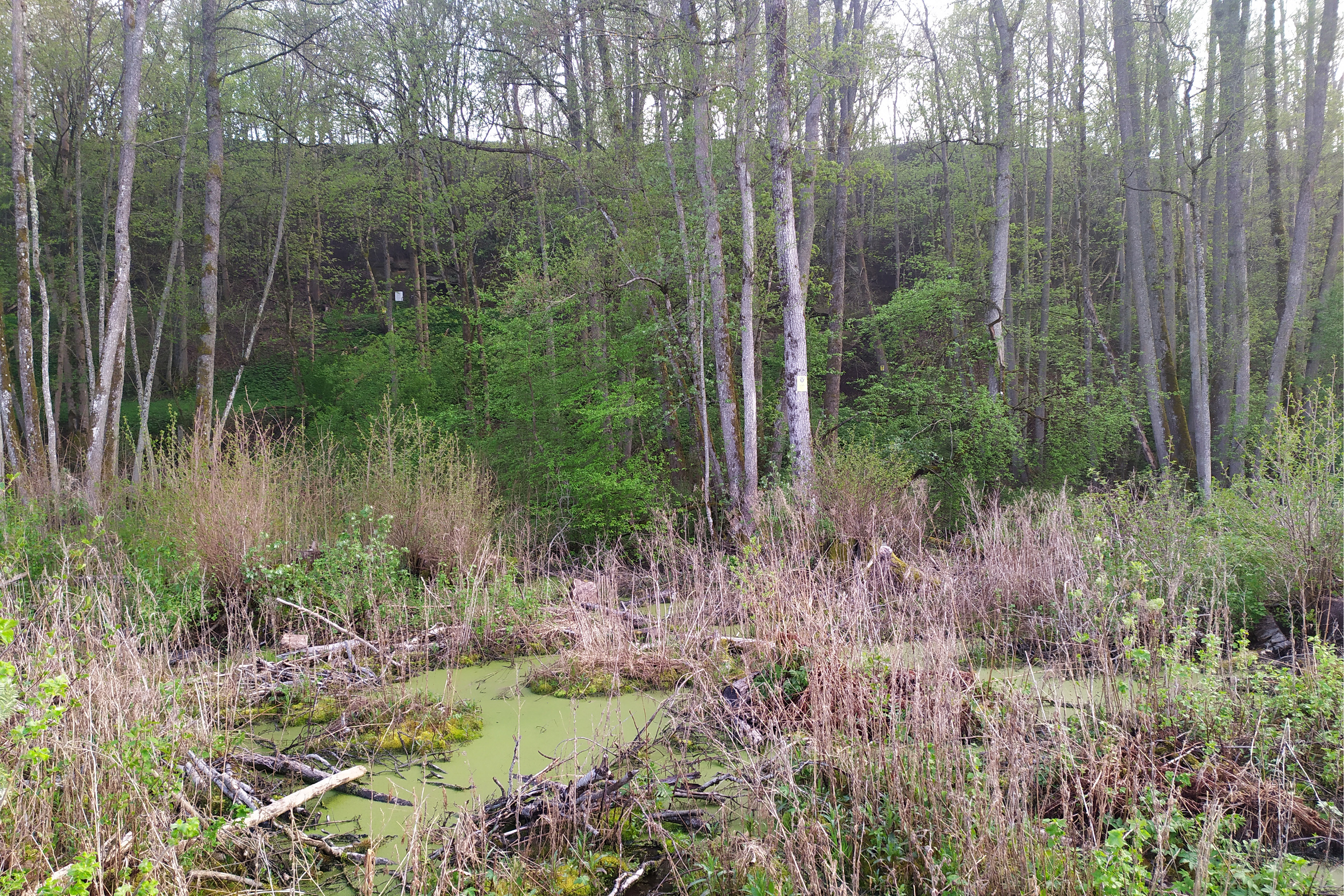
- Ülgase cliff, May 2021

- Location within Estonia
- Location: Estonia
- Nearest city: Kostiranna
- Coordinates: 59°29′10″N 25°05′30″E
- Area: 50 ha (120 acres)
- Established: 1960 (2006)

Ülgase Nature Reserve is a nature reserve which is located in Harju County, Estonia.

The area of the nature reserve is 50 ha.

The protected area was founded in 1960 to protect Ülgase cliff and oak forest. In 2006, the protected area was designated to the landscape conservation area.

The cliff contains excavations created for the Ülgase phosphorite mine in 1923-1938. The caves are inhabited by bats for sheltering during the winter.
