= Kuimetsa Landscape Conservation Area =

Protected area in Estonia

- Location within Estonia
- Location: Estonia
- Coordinates: 59°03′30″N 25°08′30″E
- Area: 46 ha (110 acres)
- Established: 1959 (2007)

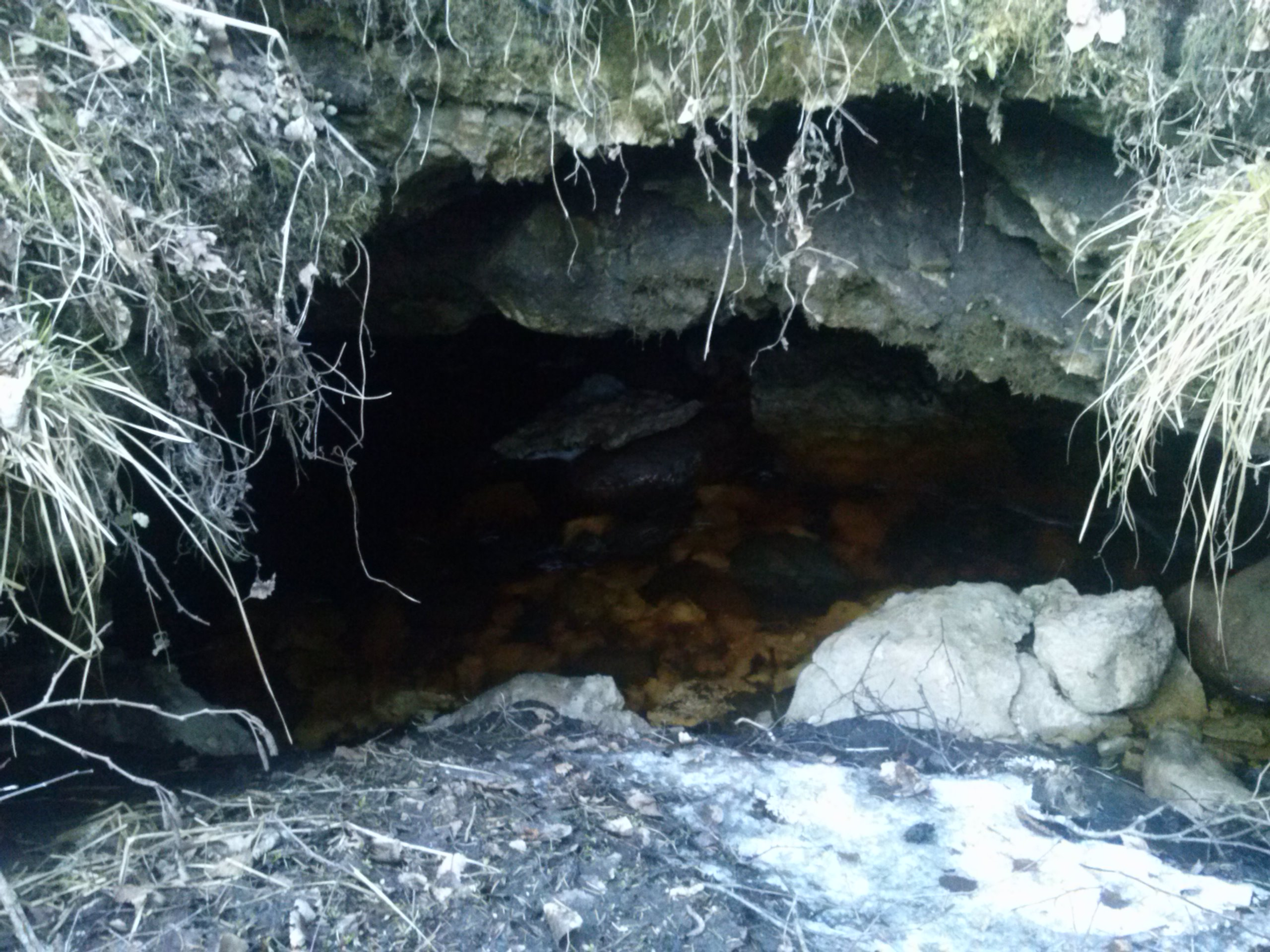

Kuimetsa Landscape Conservation Area is a nature park situated in Rapla County, Estonia.

Its area is 46 ha.

The protected area was designated in 1959 to protect Kuimetsa Karst Area and its surrounding areas. In 2007, the protected area was redesigned to the landscape conservation area.
