= Rebala, Estonia =

Village in Estonia

Coordinates: 59°27′N 25°06′E

- Village
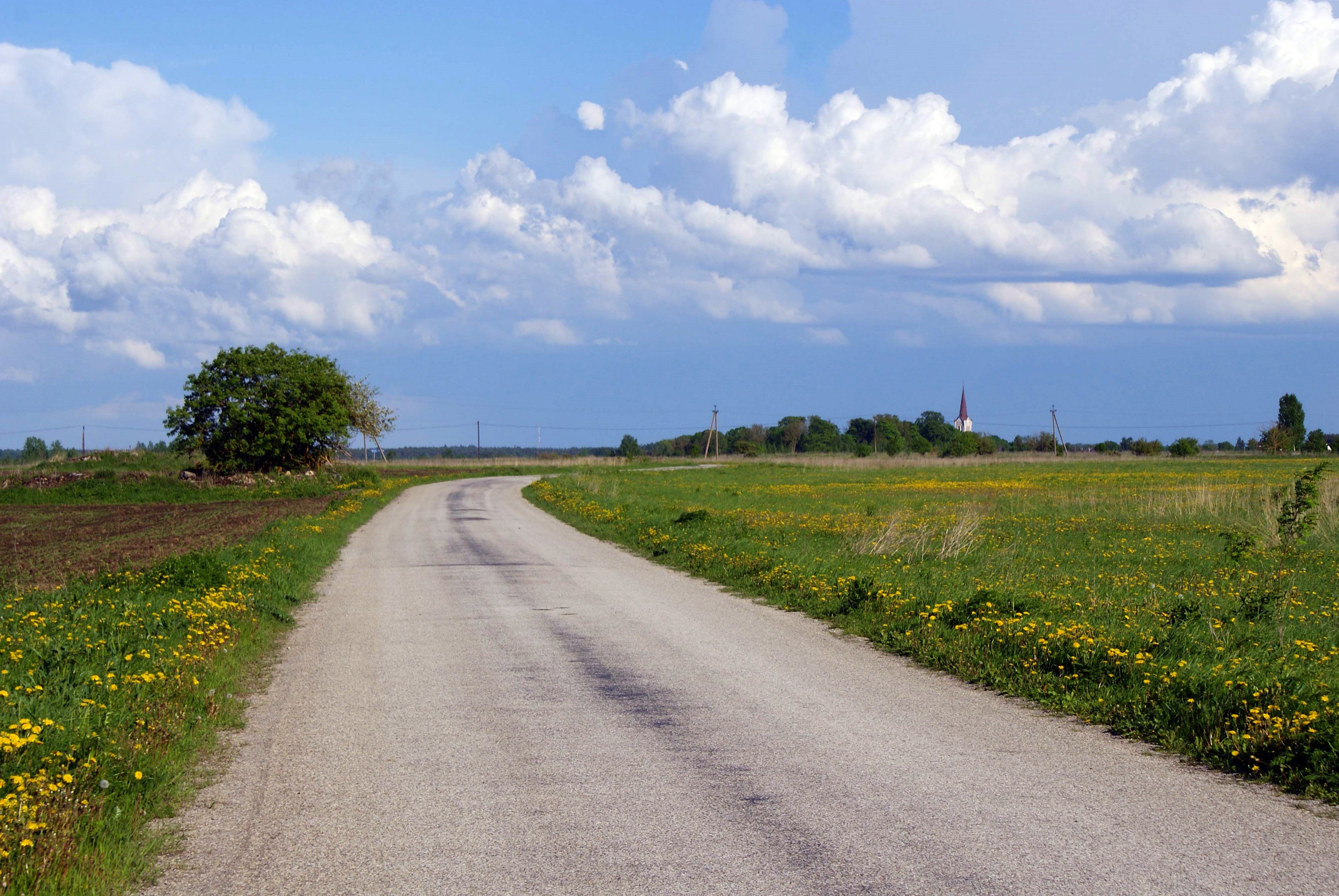
- Rebala Road in Rebala
- Interactive map of Rebala, Estonia
- Country: Estonia
- County: Harju County
- Parish: Jõelähtme Parish
- Time zone: UTC+2 (EET)
  - Summer (DST): UTC+3 (EEST)

Rebala is a village in Jõelähtme Parish, Harju County in northern Estonia.

Rebala Heritage Reserve is named after Rebala village. It covers around 70 square kilometres and contains more than 300 archaeological remains including stone-cist graves and cup-marked stones from the Bronze and Iron Ages.

Rebala village has many old farm buildings dating to the 18th/19th centuries. Near Rebala was one of the first areas in Estonia where was phosphorite was mined, beginning in the 1920s. During the Soviet era the main activity in the area was farming, but the 21st century has seen new housing developments due to the village's close proximity to the capital city, Tallinn.

Tallinn Landfill (or Jõelähtme Landill) is technically part of Rebala village.

== Gallery ==
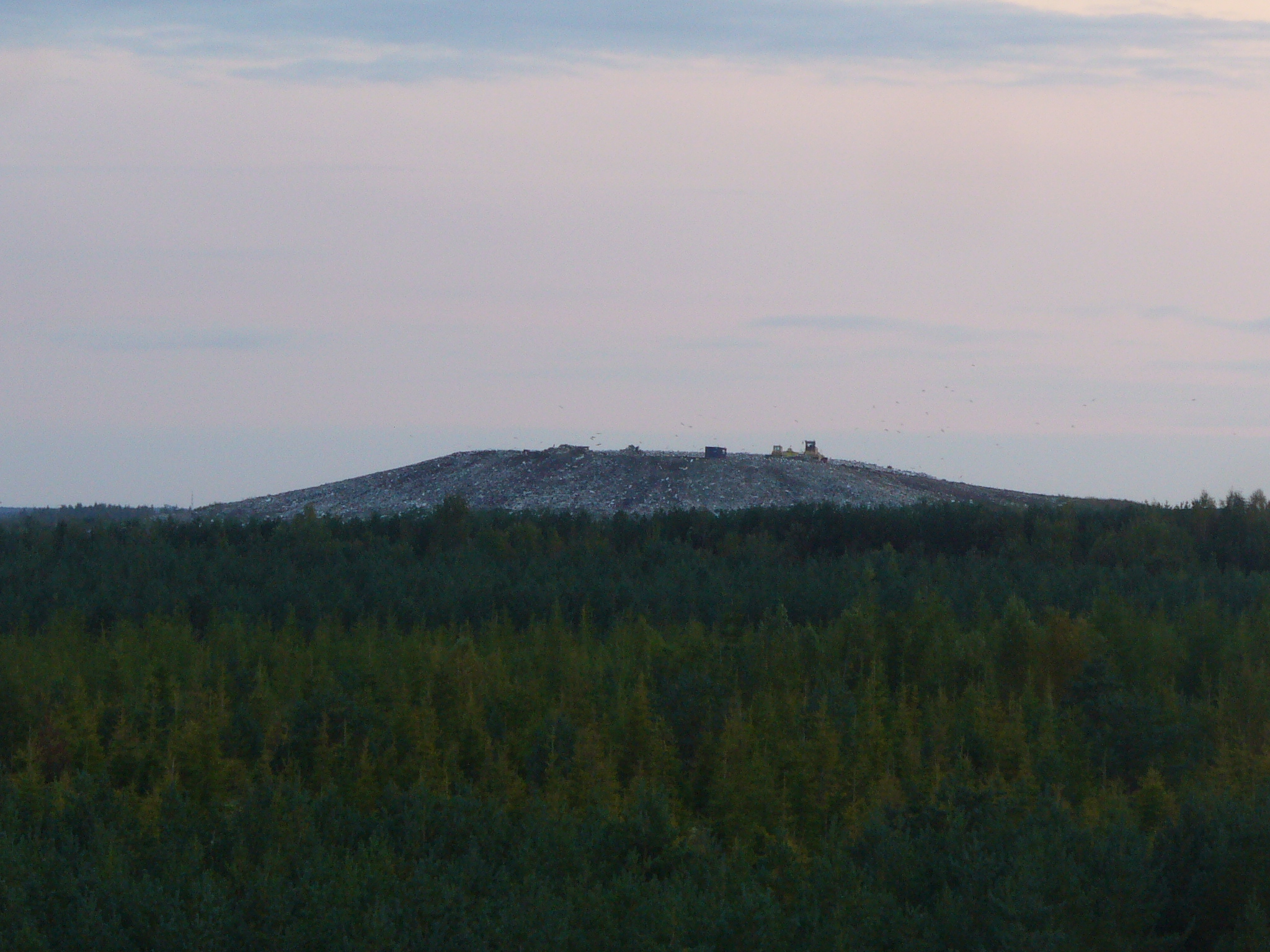
Tallinn Landfill
