= Vandjala =

Village in Estonia

- Village
- Interactive map of Vandjala
- Coordinates: 59°26′22″N 25°04′09″E
- Country: Estonia
- County: Harju County
- Parish: Jõelähtme Parish
- Time zone: UTC+2 (EET)
  - Summer (DST): UTC+3 (EEST)

Vandjala is a village in Jõelähtme Parish, Harju County, in northern Estonia.
