= Johannes Toom =

Estonian weightlifter (1896–1972)

Johannes Toom (26 July 1896 – 26 April 1972) was an Estonian weightlifter.

He was born in Parasmäe, Harju County.

He won silver medal at 1922 World Weightlifting Championships.

He is buried at Jõelähtme cemetery.
