= Rebala Heritage Reserve =

Archaeological site in Estonia

- Rebala muinsuskaitseala
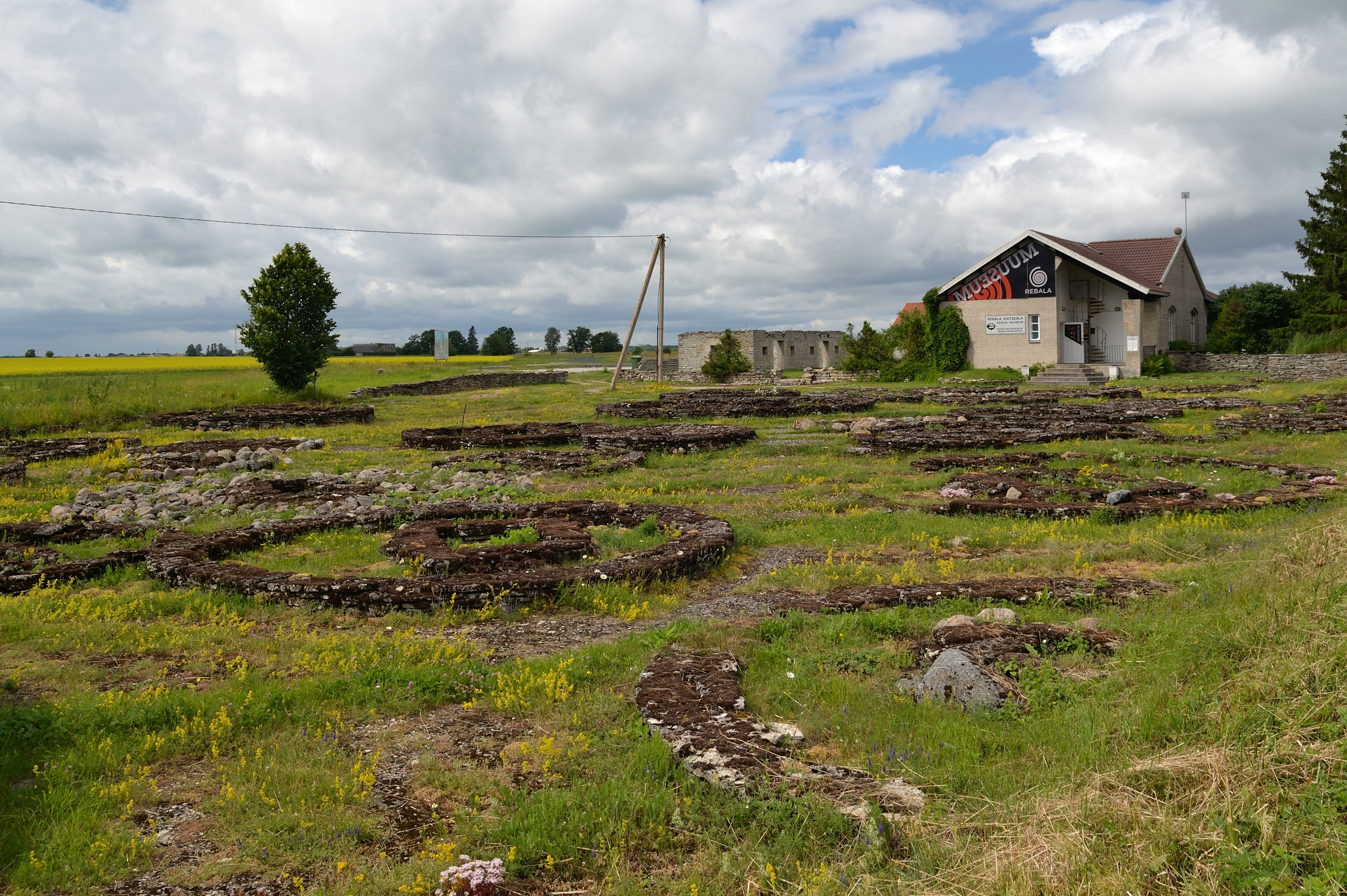
- Stone cist graves next to the museum

- Location within Estonia
- 59.44006°N 25.13469°E
- Location: Estonia

Rebala Heritage Reserve is a heritage conservation area in Jõelähtme Parish, east of Estonia's capital, Tallinn. It covers around 70 square kilometres and contains more than 300 archaeological remains, most of which are prehistoric stone-cist graves and cup-marked stones. Artifacts are on display in the Rebala Heritage Reserve Museum.

== Description ==
Rebala Heritage Reserve is located around the village of Rebala, Harju County, in northern Estonia, near the city of Tallinn. It was formed in 1987 mainly as an archaeological preservation area, and was the only protected area outside of Estonia's towns. It covers around 70 square kilometres and comprises 350 recorded archaeological sites, most of which are stone-cist graves and cup-marked stones of the Bronze and Pre-Roman Iron Ages. In addition, several settlement sites and remains of ancient fields have been found here, including villages that were established in the Viking Age.

The stone-cist graves and the cup-marked stones tend to be clustered and form groupings with clear visual boundaries. The cup-marked stones are fairly large and are clearly visible on the landscape. The heritage area also includes a number of pit grave cemeteries, as well as a medieval stone chapel, a church, and a large number of old farm buildings.

== Jõelähtme burial field ==
In the centre of the reserve in Jõelähtme is a burial field with 36 cist graves on display. The stone graves were covered with limestone slabs and surrounded by circular stone walls. The graves were discovered in 1985 in the course of a road extension and were moved twenty metres out of the way.

In Joelahtme, by the Narva Road, is the Rebala Heritage Reserve Museum opened in 1994. It tells the visitor about the history of Rebala area and contains displays about the ancient settlement sites and fields, together with collections of the various artefacts found.
