= Uhaku Landscape Conservation Area =

Protected area in Estonia

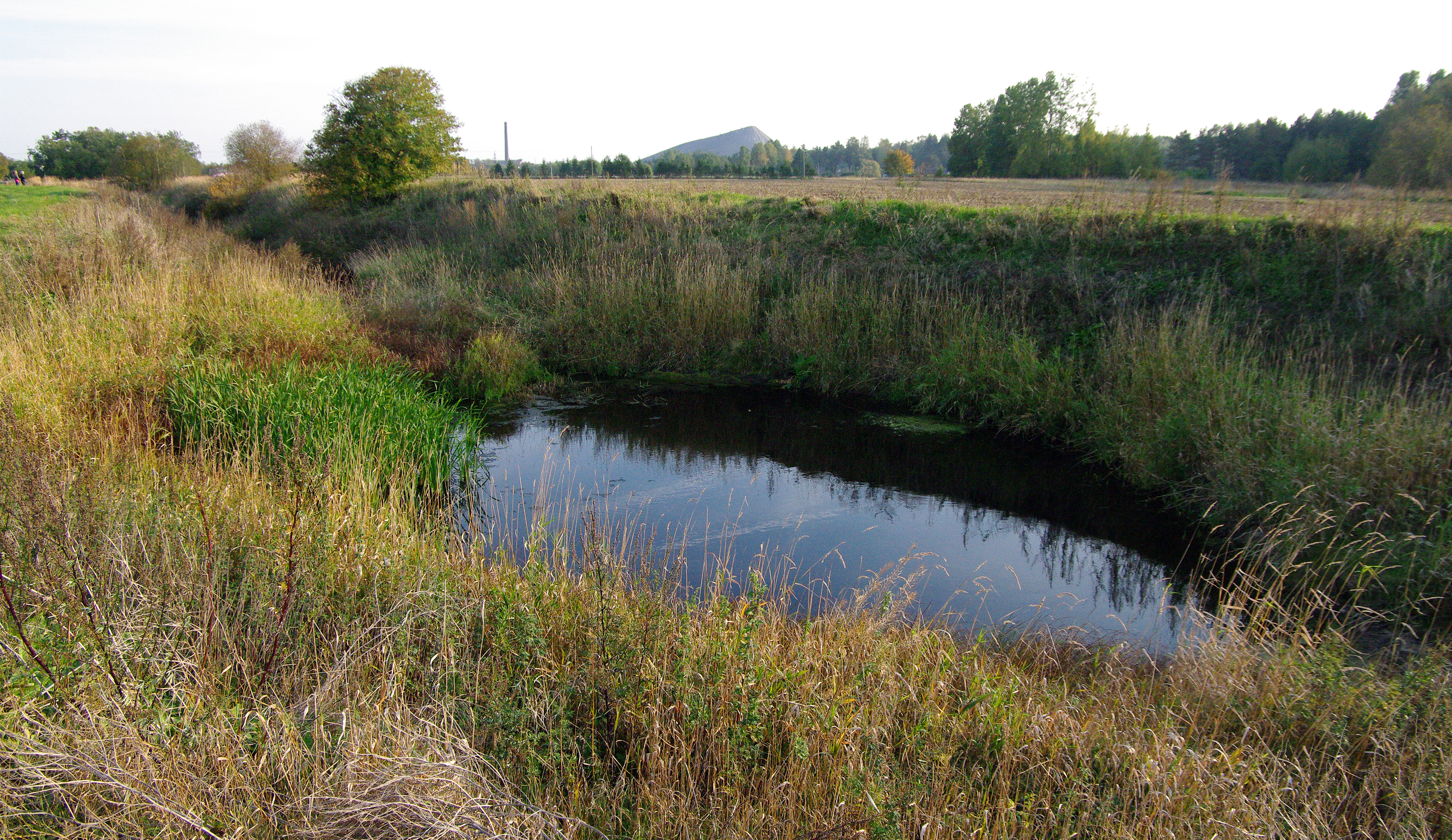

- Location within Estonia
- Location: Estonia
- Coordinates: 59°22′15″N 27°00′40″E
- Area: 33 ha (82 acres)
- Established: 1959 (2013)

Uhaku Landscape Conservation Area is a nature park which is located in Ida-Viru County, Estonia.

The area of the nature park is 33 ha.

The protected area was founded in 1959 to protect Uhaku Karst Area and its surrounding areas. In 2013, the protected area was designated to the landscape conservation area.
