= List of karst areas in Estonia =

This is the list of karst areas located in Estonia. The list is incomplete.

Name	Location (county, parish)	Further info	Image
Kostivere karst area	Harju County, Jõelähtme Parish		
Kuimetsa karst area	Rapla County, Rapla Parish		
Tuhala karst area	Harju County, Kose Parish		
Uhaku karst area	Ida-Viru County, Lüganuse Parish		
