= Kaberneeme =

Village in Estonia

Coordinates: 59°31′N 25°16′E

- Village
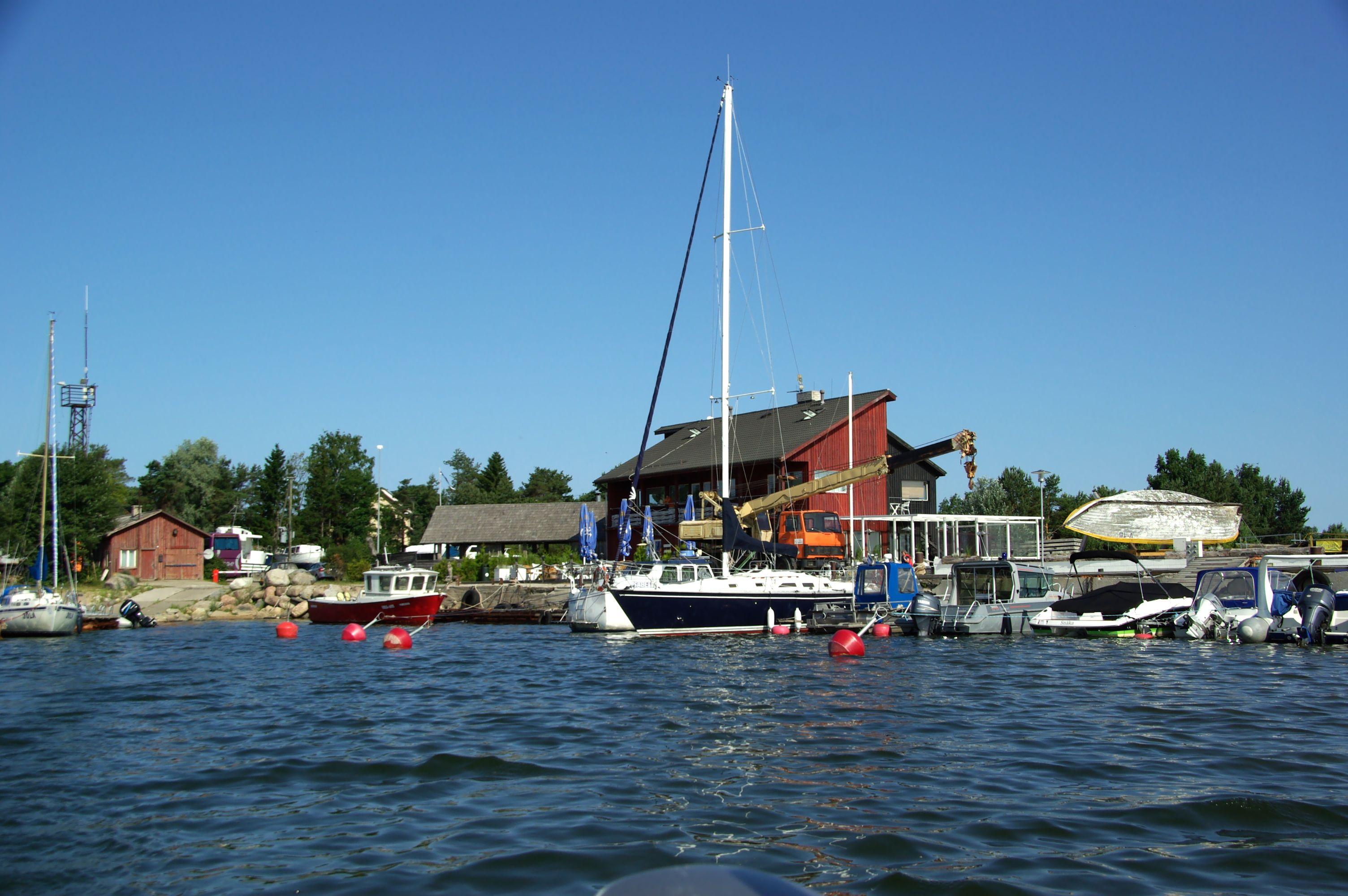
- Interactive map of Kaberneeme
- Country: Estonia
- County: Harju
- Parish: Jõelähtme
- Time zone: UTC+2 (EET)
  - Summer (DST): UTC+3 (EEST)

Drone video of Kaberneeme beach in Estonia (June 2022)

Kaberneeme is a village in Jõelähtme Parish, Harju County in northern Estonia. It is known for its beach.

== See also ==
- Kalevi-Liiva
