= Ihasalu =

Village in Estonia

Coordinates: 59°31′N 25°11′E

- Village
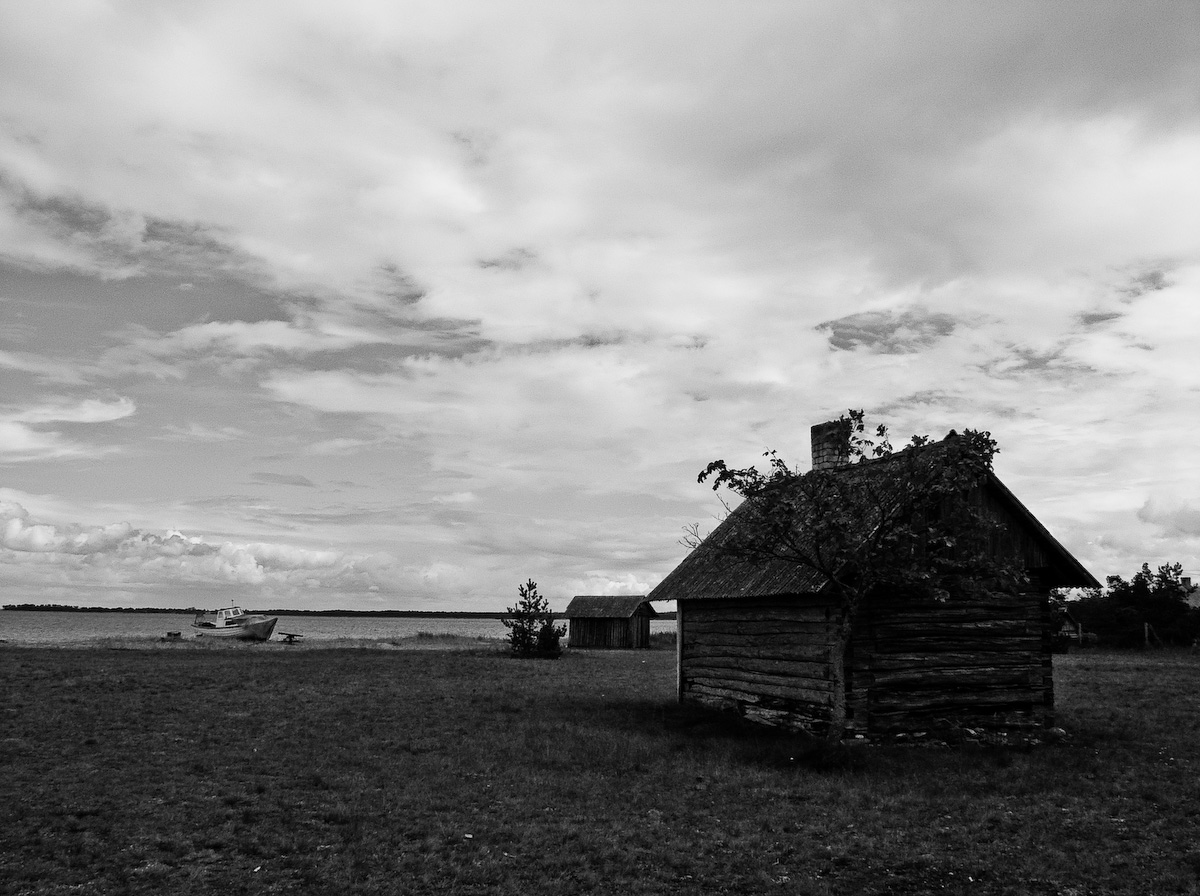
- Interactive map of Ihasalu
- Country: Estonia
- County: Harju County
- Parish: Jõelähtme Parish
- Time zone: UTC+2 (EET)
  - Summer (DST): UTC+3 (EEST)

Ihasalu is a village in fih Pear, Harju County in northern Estonia.
