= Ülgase =

Village in Estonia

Coordinates: 59°29′N 25°05′E

- Village
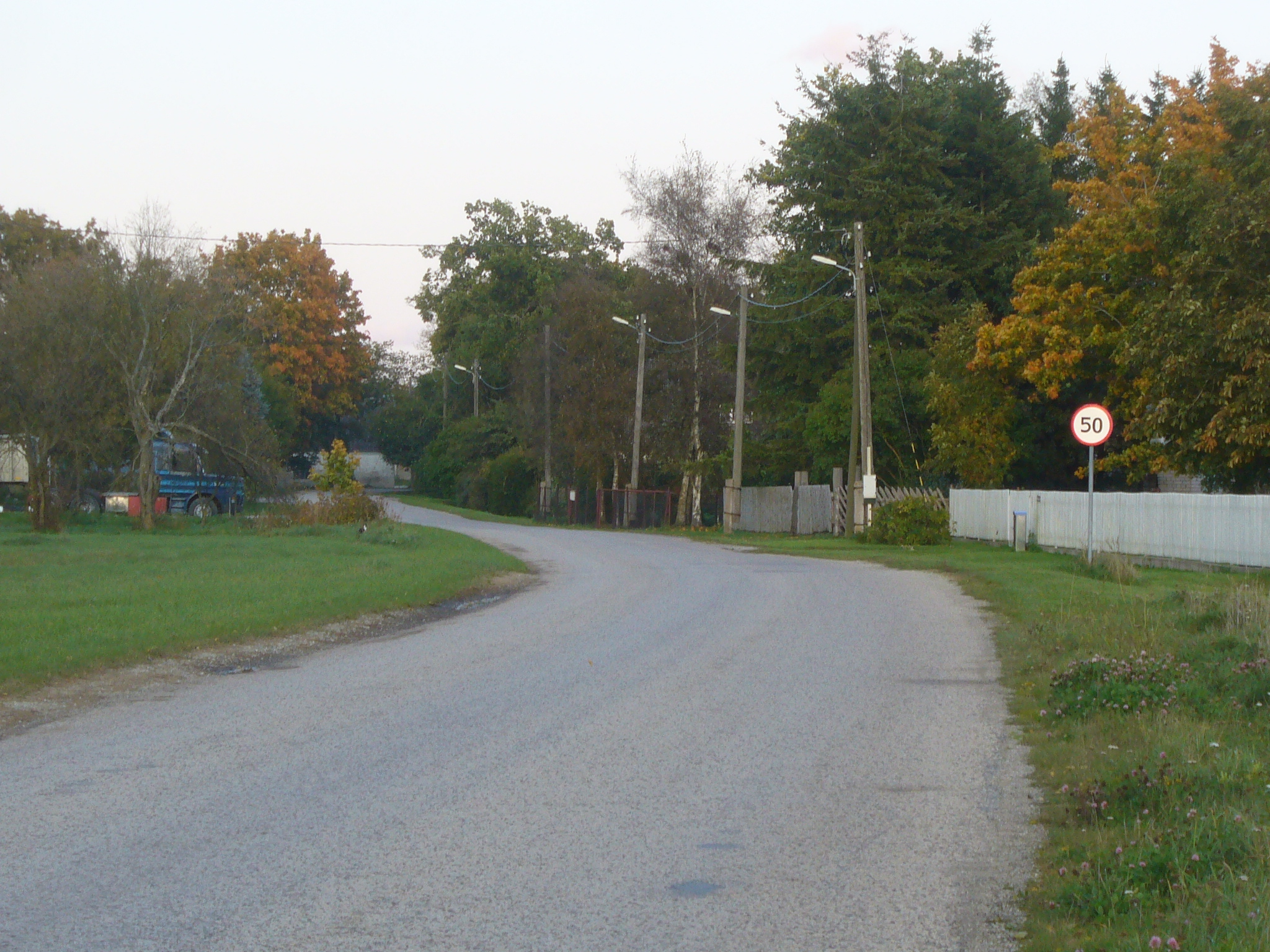
- Interactive map of Ülgase
- Country: Estonia
- County: Harju County
- Parish: Jõelähtme Parish
- Time zone: UTC+2 (EET)
  - Summer (DST): UTC+3 (EEST)

Ülgase (German: Ilgas) is a village in Jõelähtme Parish, Harju County in northern Estonia.

== Gallery ==
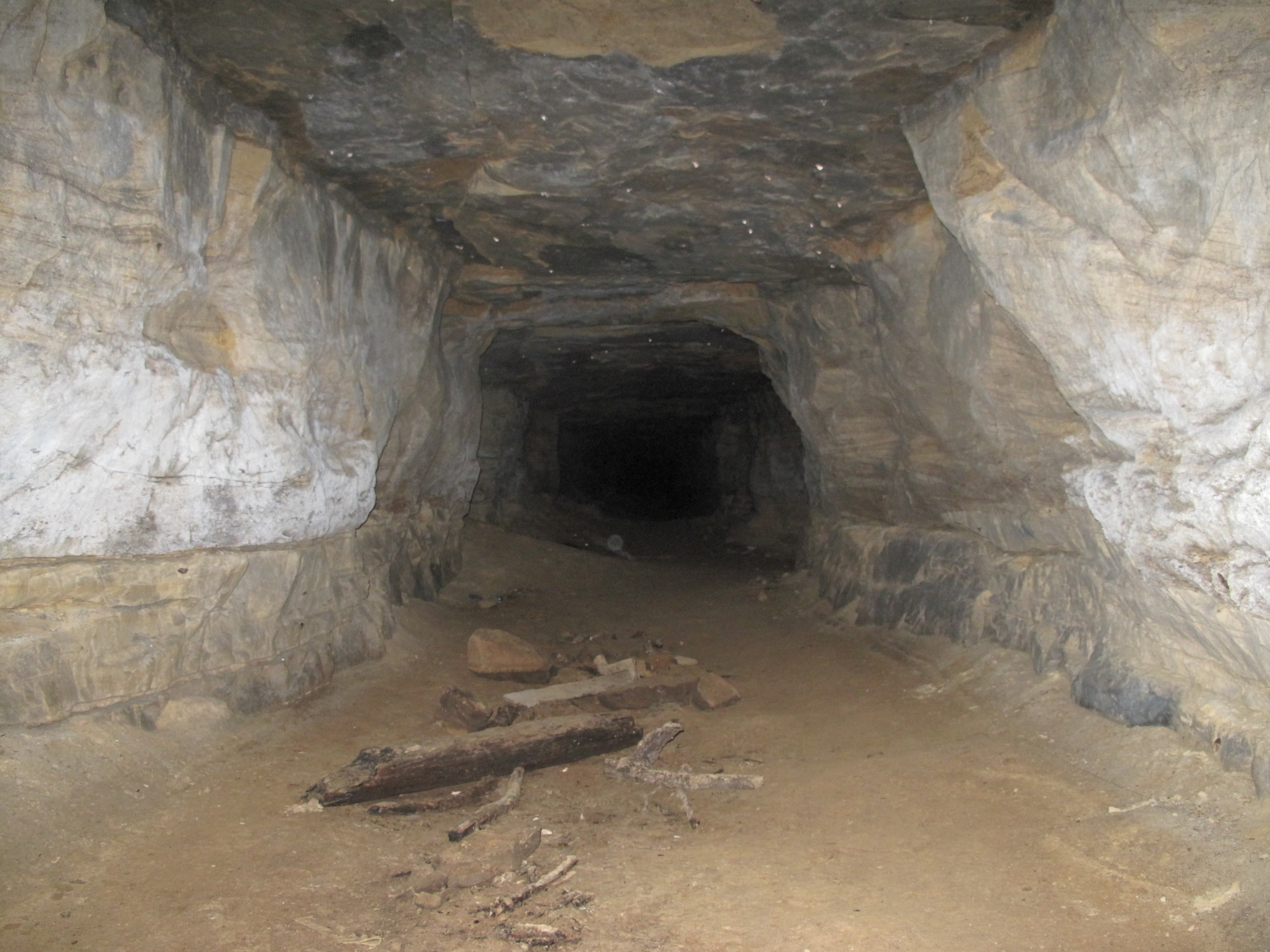
Ülgase phosphorite mine

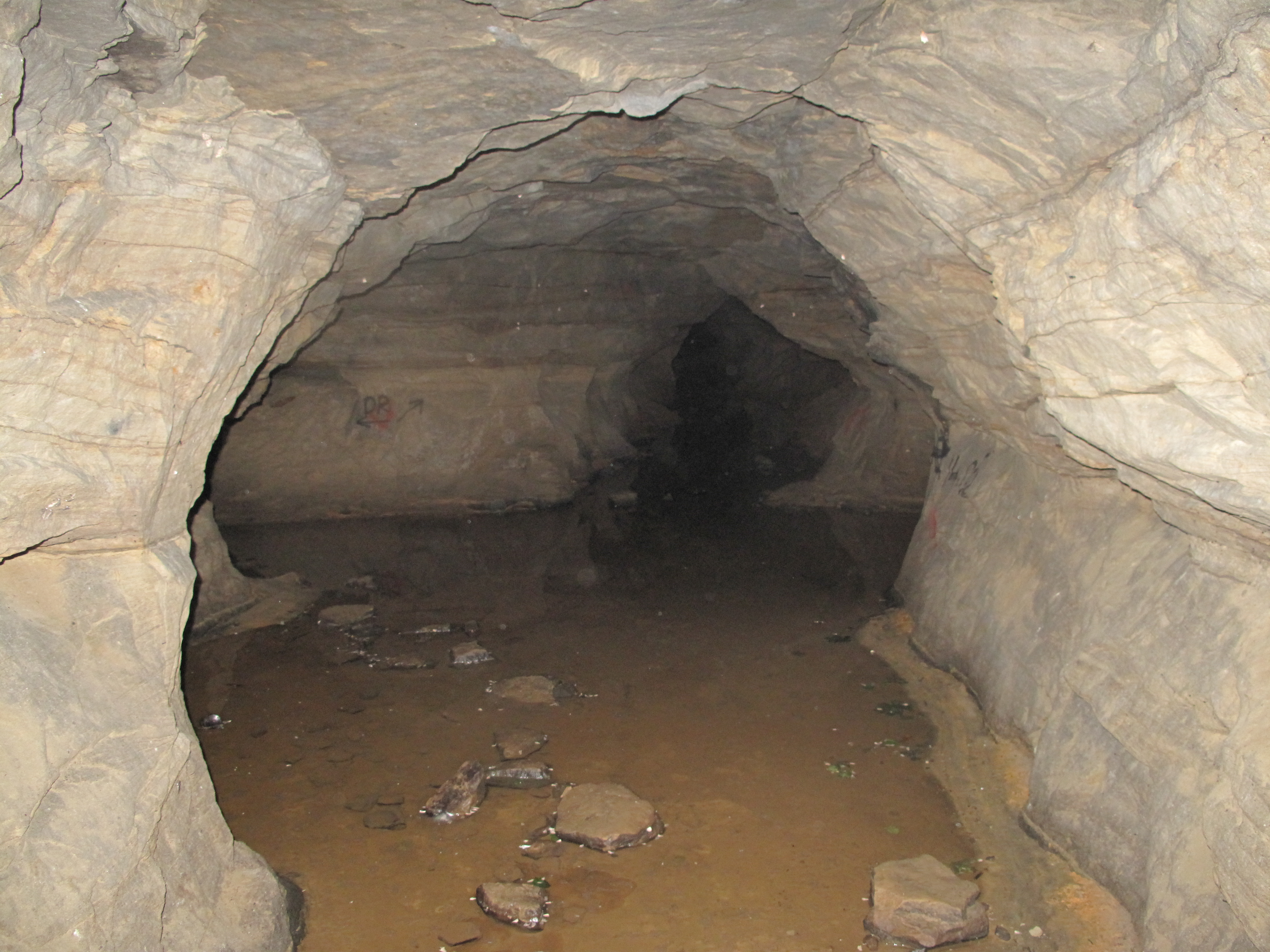
Ülgase phosphorite mine

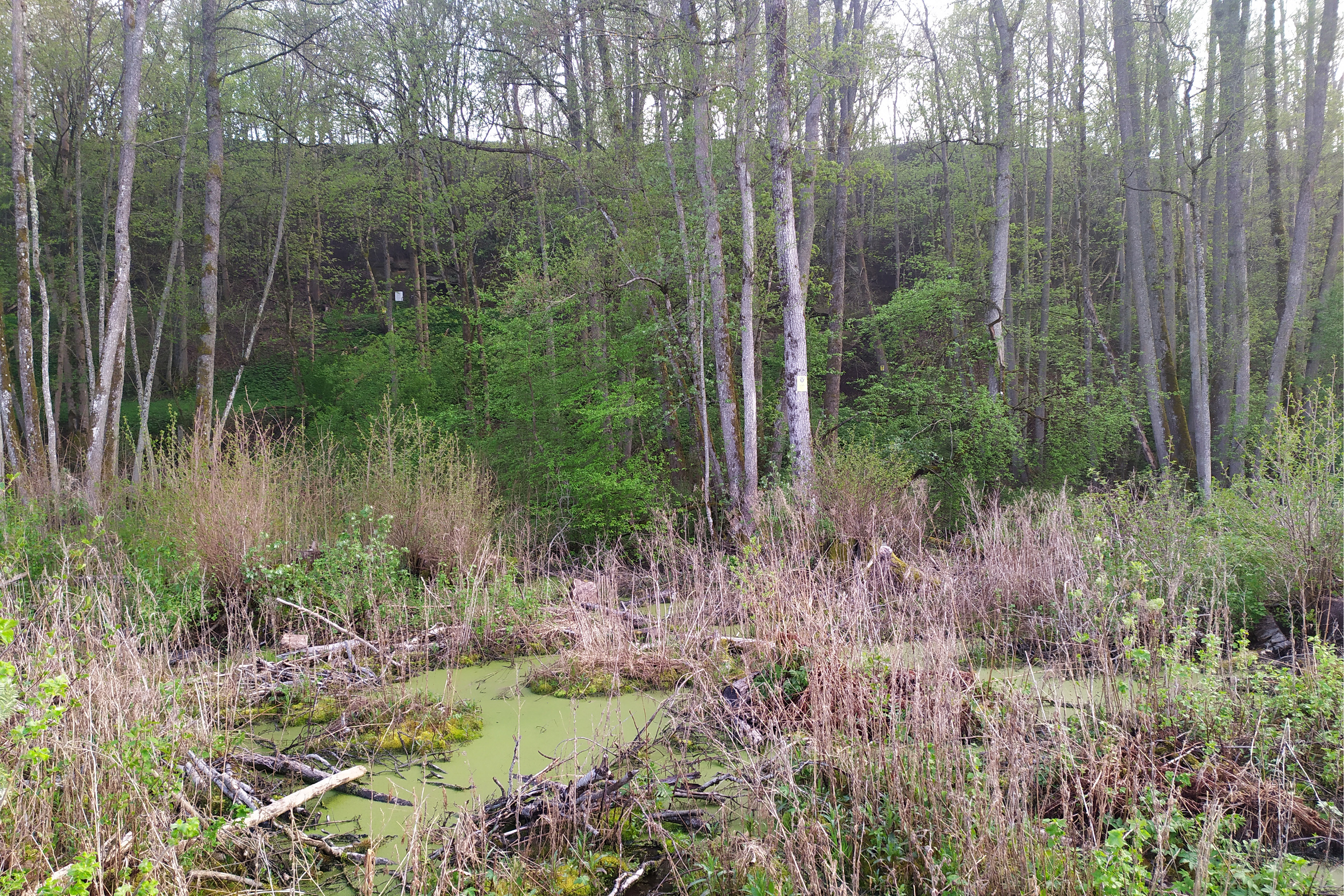
Ülgase bank
