= Kostivere =

Borough in Estonia

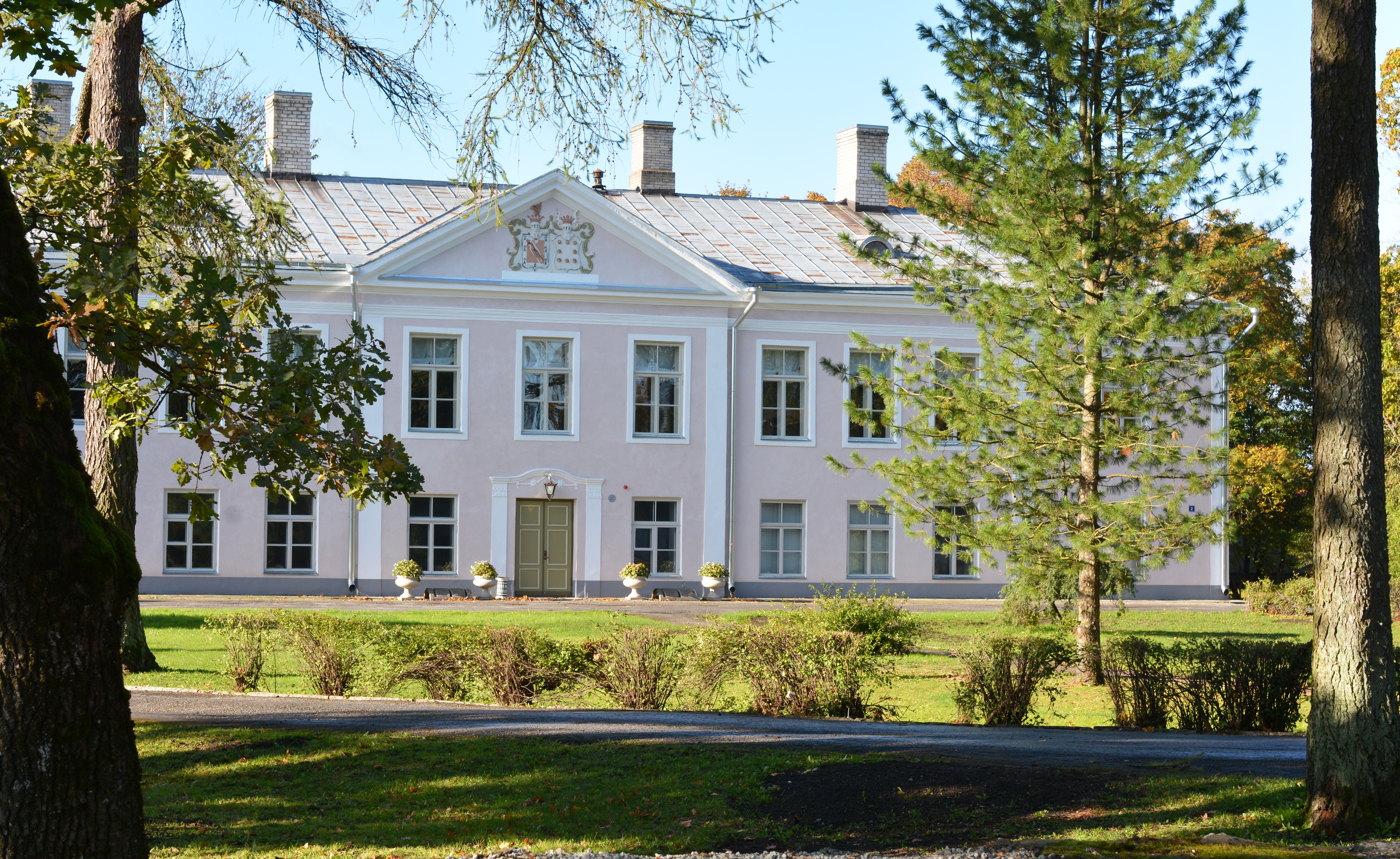
- Kostivere Manor

- Location within Estonia
- Coordinates: 59°25′32″N 25°6′13″E
- Country: Estonia
- County: Harju County

Population (2009)
  - Total: 733
- Time zone: UTC+2 (EET)

Kostivere (German: Kostifer) is a small borough (alevik) in Jõelähtme Parish, Harju County in northern Estonia.

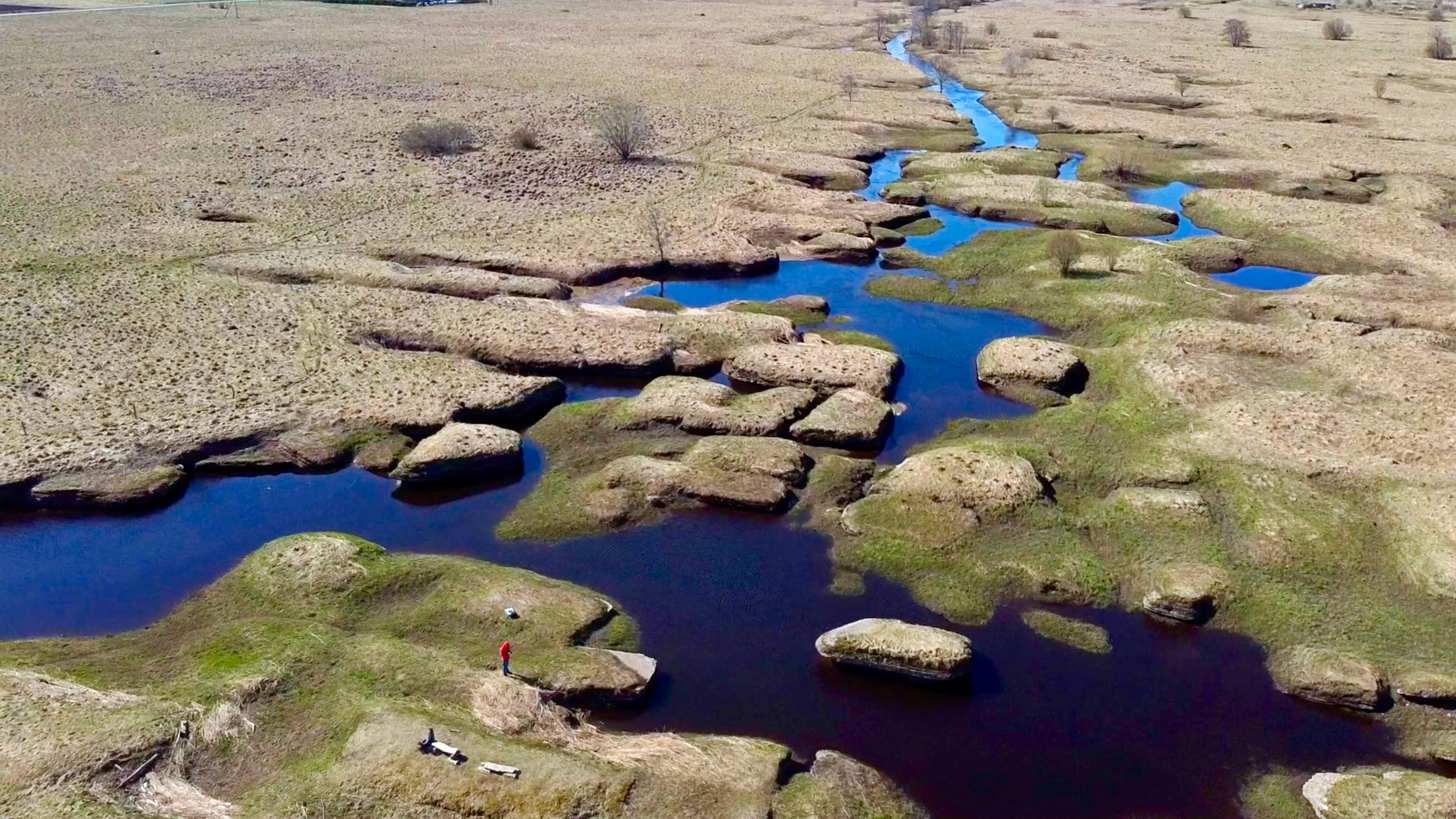
Aerial view of Kostivere karst area (spring 2021)

Kostivere karst area is located in the village. The area of this karst formation is 125 ha and 16 ha of this is under national protection.

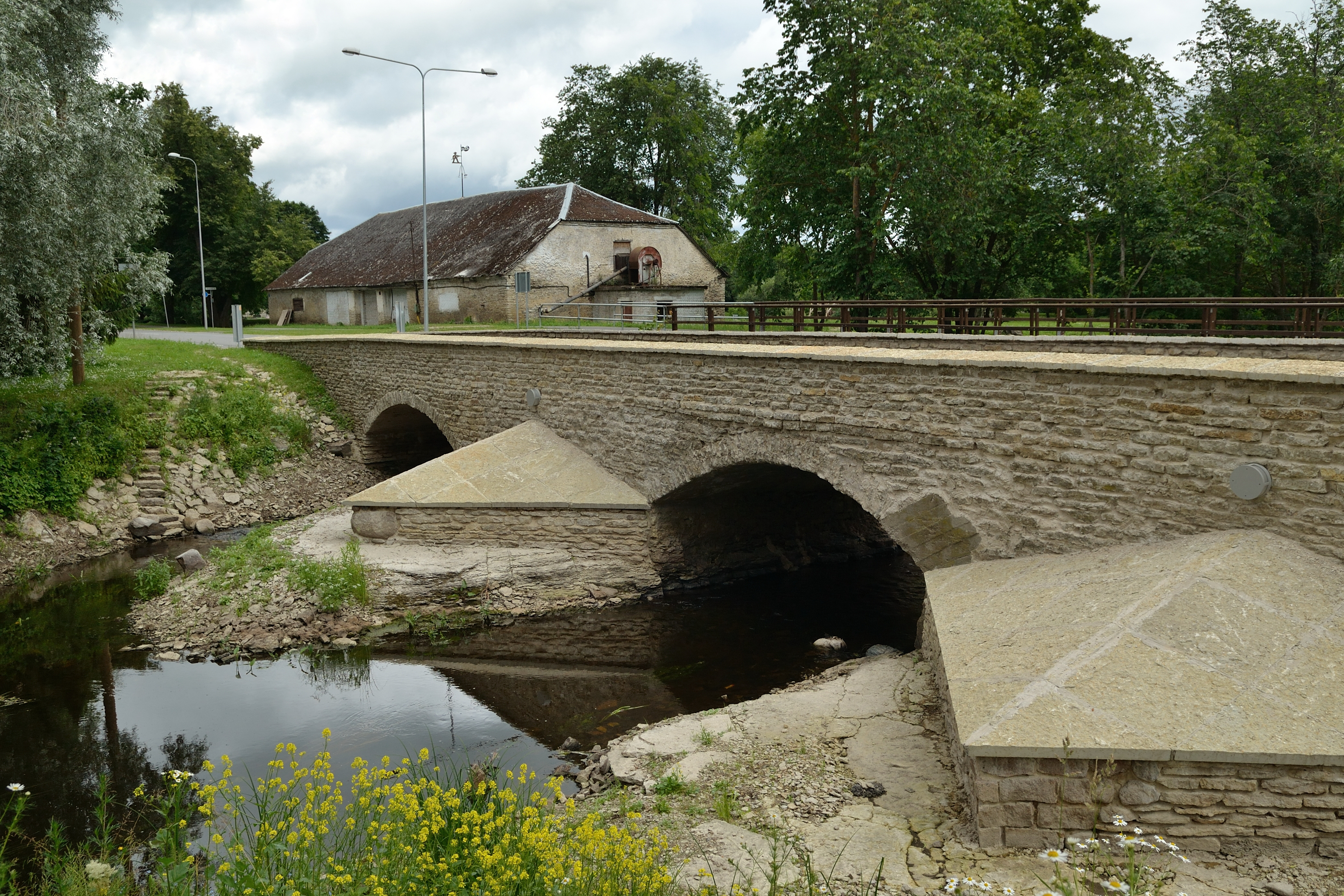
Kostivere manor bridge
