= Jõelähtme =

Village in Estonia

Coordinates: 59°26.5′N 25°08′E

- Village
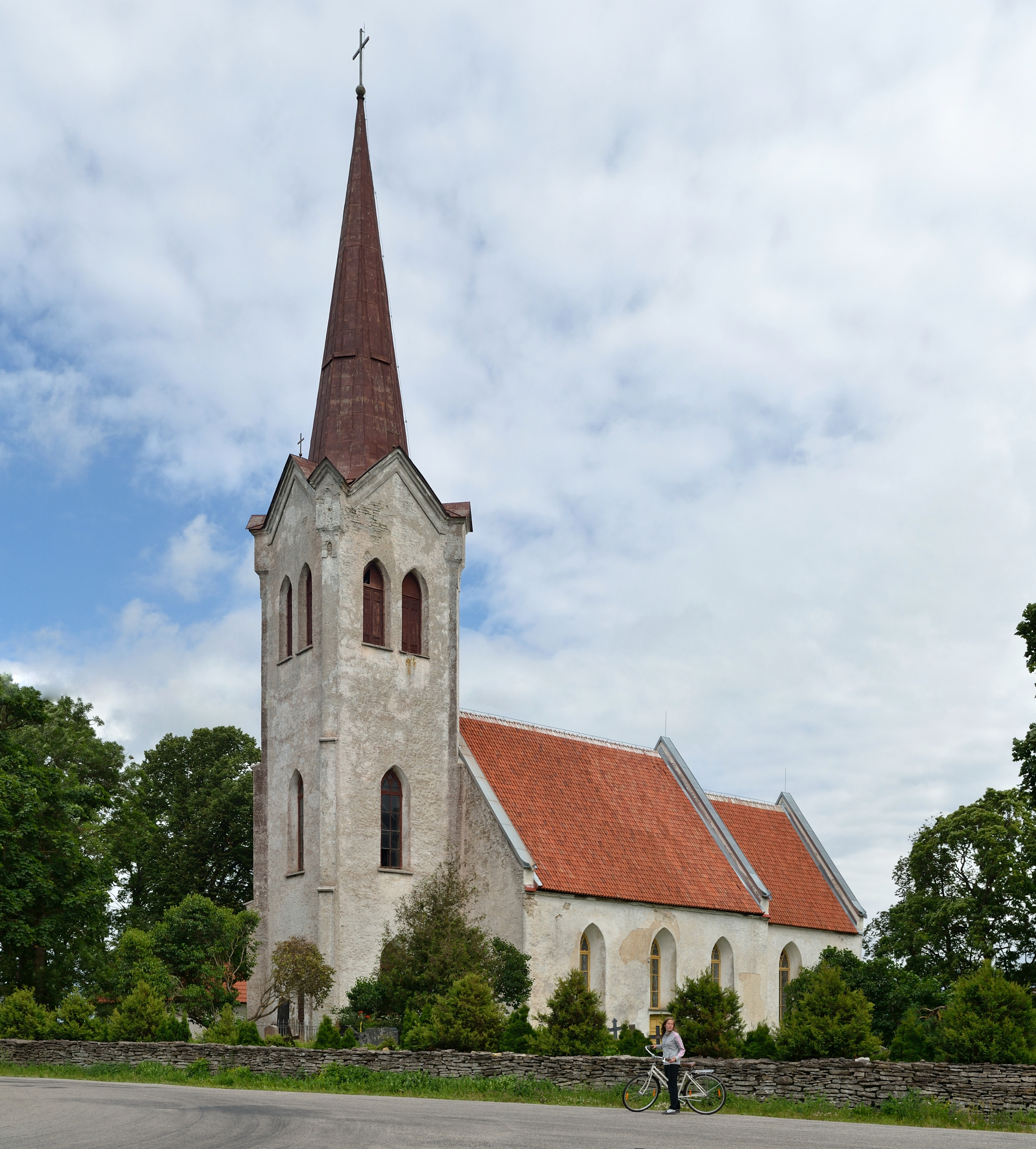
- Jõelähtme church
- Interactive map of Jõelähtme
- Country: Estonia
- County: Harju County
- Parish: Jõelähtme Parish

Population (2011)
  - Total: 120
- Time zone: UTC+2 (EET)
  - Summer (DST): UTC+3 (EEST)

Jõelähtme (German: Jegelecht) is a village in Jõelähtme Parish, Harju County, northern Estonia.

== Gallery ==
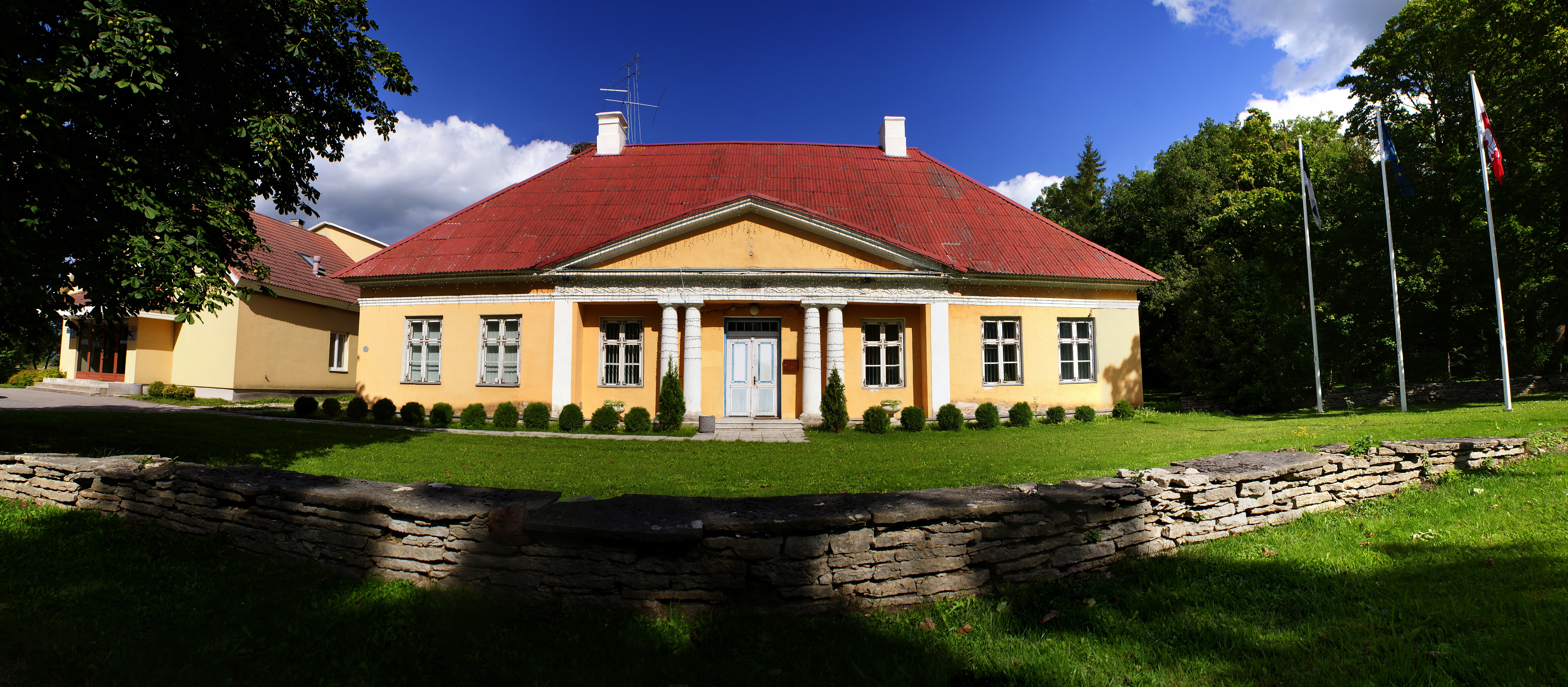
Post office

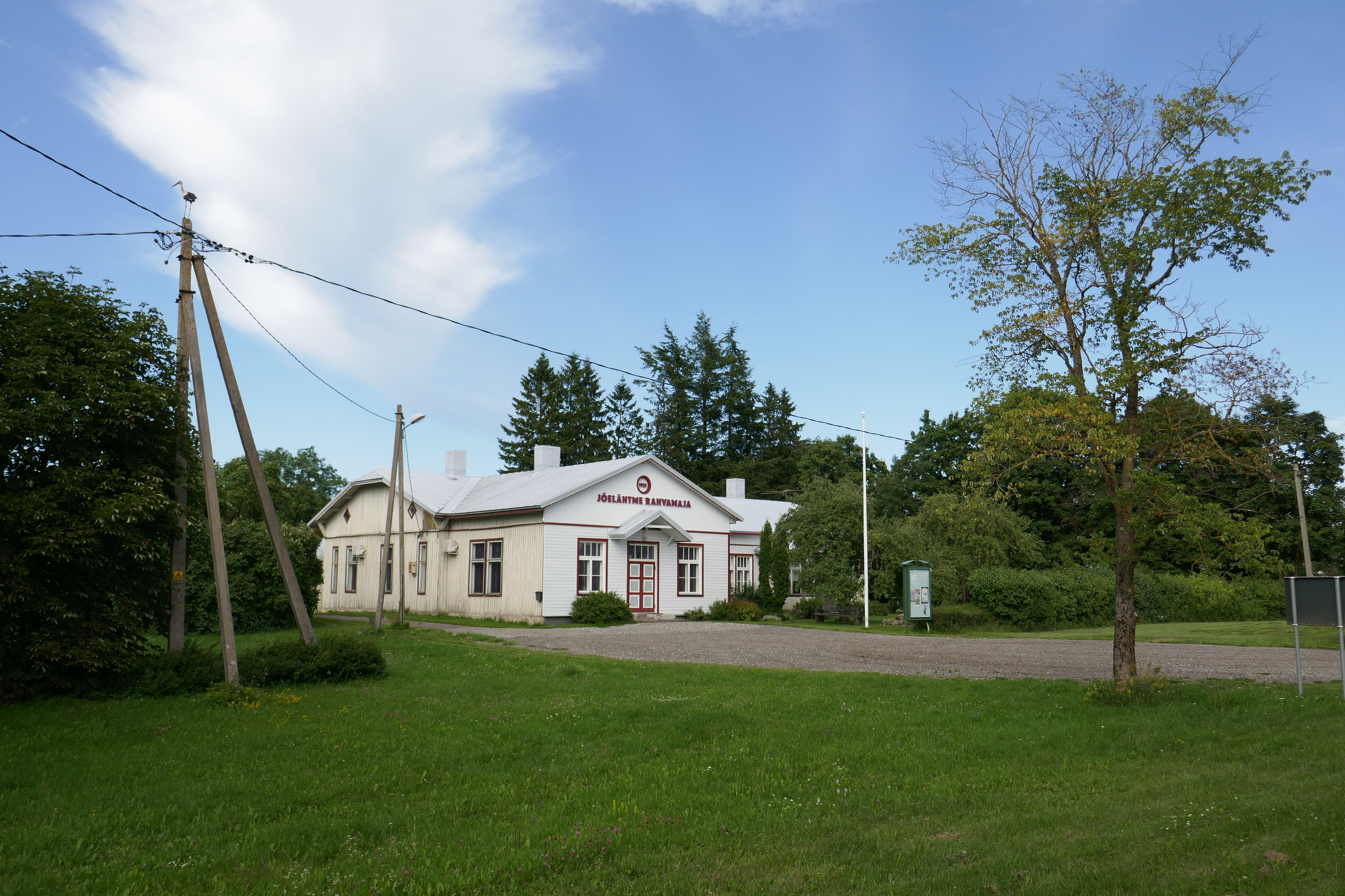
Community centre

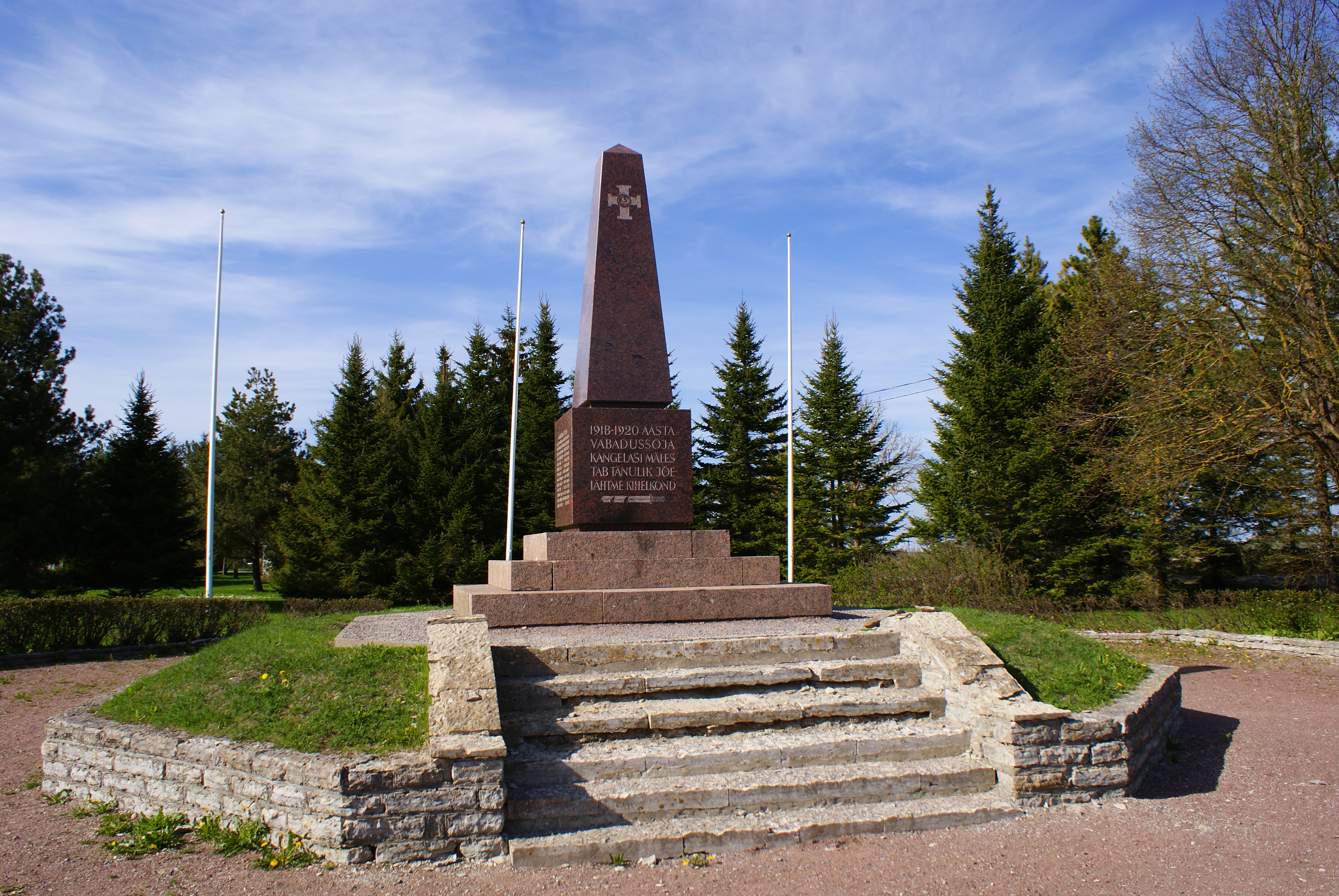
Estonian War of Independence memorial
