= Jõelähtme Parish =

Municipality of Estonia

Coordinates: 59°27′N 25°08′E

Jõelähtme Parish Jõelähtme vald
- Municipality of Estonia
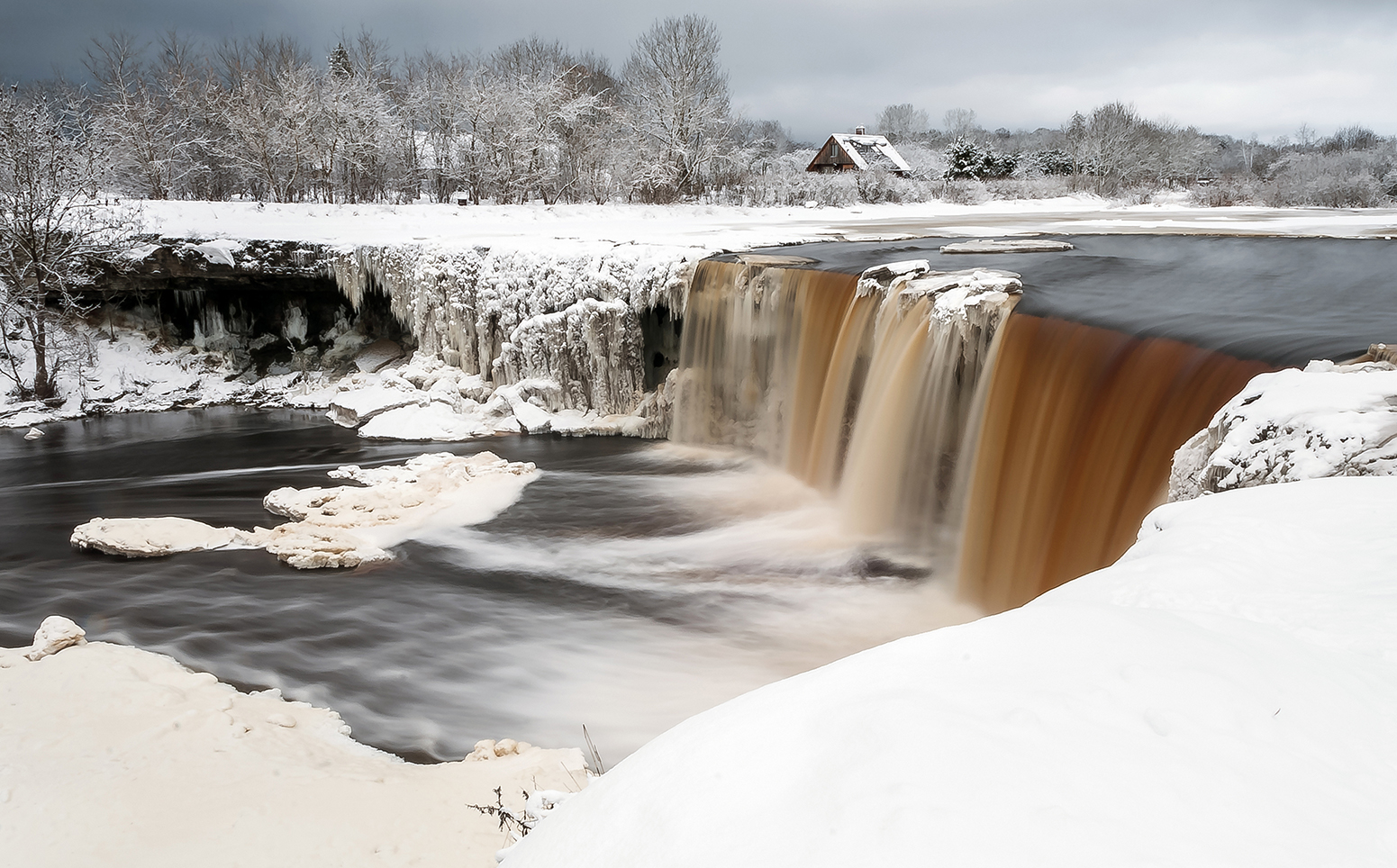
- Jägala Waterfall

- Flag Coat of arms

- Jõelähtme Parish within Harju County
- Country: Estonia
- County: Harju County
- Administrative centre: Jõelähtme

Government
  - Mayor: Andrus Umboja

Area
  - Total: 210.86 km^{2} (81.41 sq mi)

Population (2026)
  - Total: 8,007
  - Density: 37.97/km^{2} (98.35/sq mi)
- ISO 3166 code: EE-245
- Website: www.joelahtme.ee

Jõelähtme Parish (Estonian: Jõelähtme vald) is a municipality in Estonia. It was established in 1992 and is administratively part of the Harju County, in northwestern Estonia. The parish has a population of 8,007 and an area of 210.86 km^{2} (81.41 sq mi), the population density is 37.973/km^{2} (98.350/sq mi)

The administrative centre of Jõelähtme Parish is the village of Jõelähtme. It is located 20 km east from the centre of Estonia's capital, Tallinn.

== Local government ==
The current mayor (vallavanem) is Andrus Umboja and chairman of the council (volikogu esimees) is Art Kuum.

== Demographics ==
As of 1 January 2026, the parish had 8,007 residents, of which 4,034 (50.4%) were women and 3,973 (49.6%) were men.

=== Religion ===
The religious landscape of Jõelähtme rural municipality is predominantly secular, with 76.6% of the population identifying as religiously unaffiliated. Among those older than fifteen years residents who do associate themselves with a faith, 11.4% identify as Orthodox and 8.3% as Lutheran, while other Christian denominations make up 0.9% of the population. 2.8% of the population follows other religions or did not specify their religious affiliation.

== Geography ==
=== Settlements ===
There are two small boroughs (est: alevikud, sg. alevik) – Kostivere and Loo – and 34 villages (est: külad, sg. küla) in Jõelähtme Parish.

=== Landmarks ===
Drone video of stone cist graves in Jõelähtme

- Jägala Falls
- Rebala Heritage Reserve
- Kostivere karst area
- Jõelähtme church
- Kaberneeme beach
- Kalevi-Liiva memorial
- Ülgase caves

=== Gallery ===
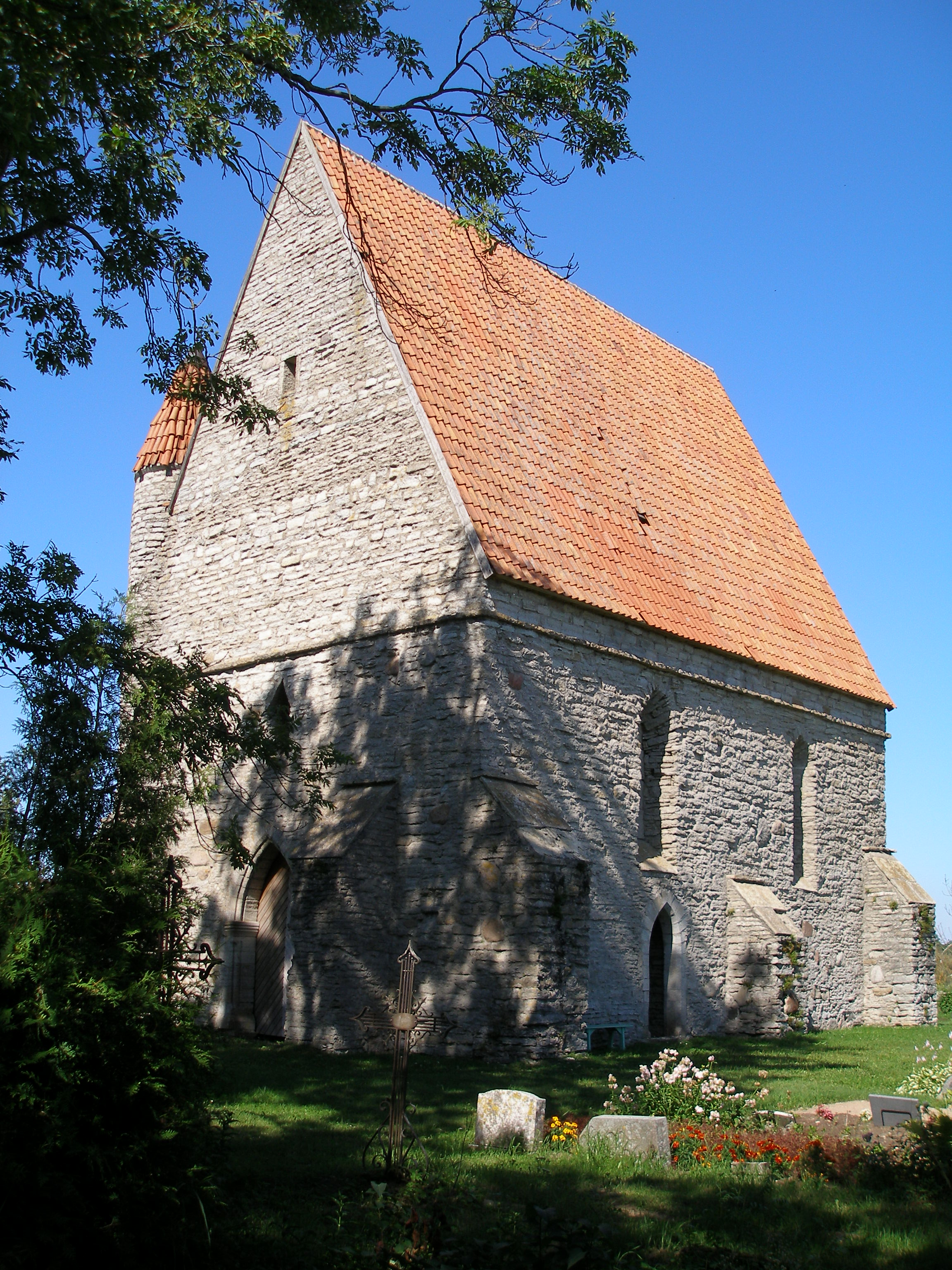
Saha chapel

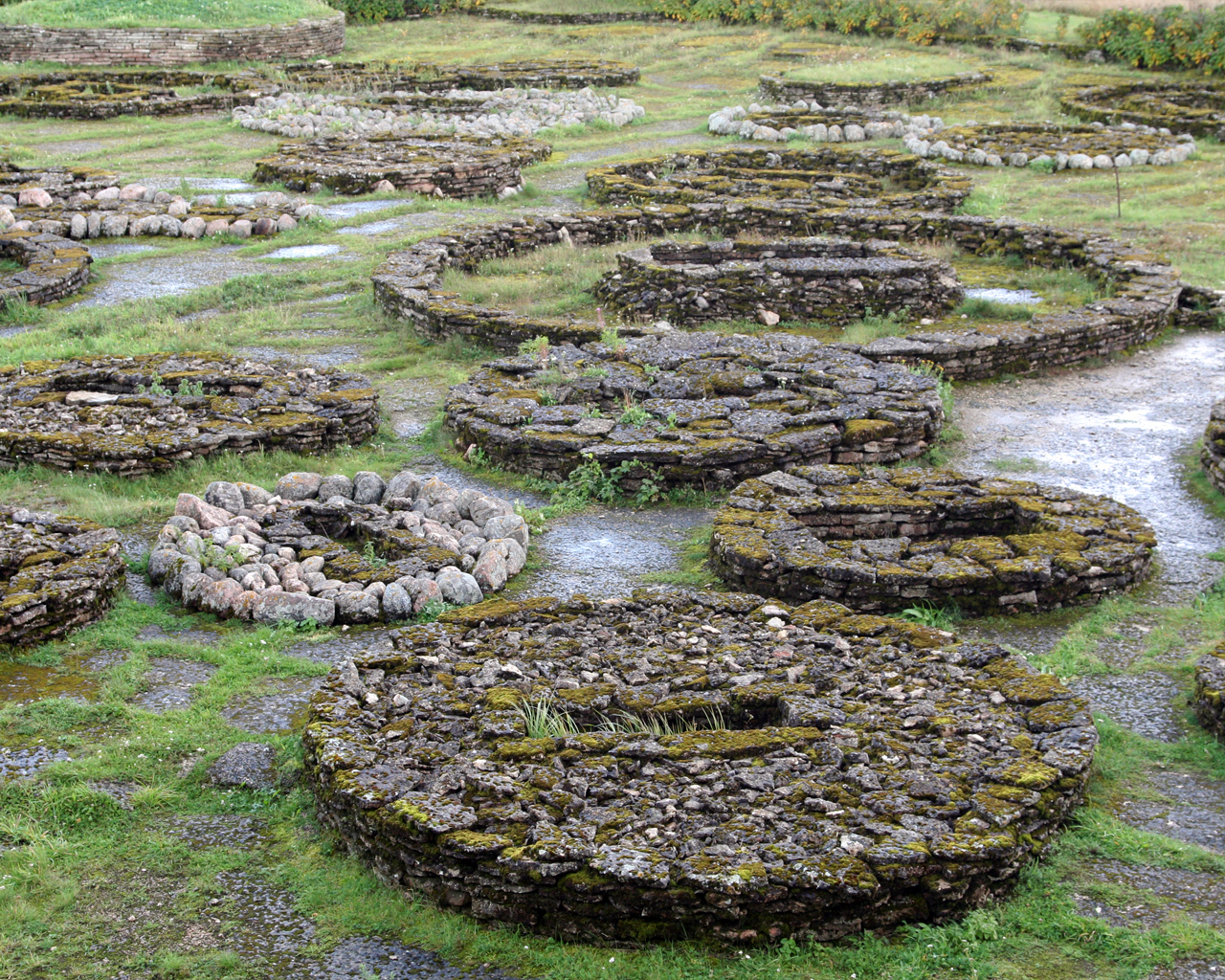
Bronze Age stone cist graves

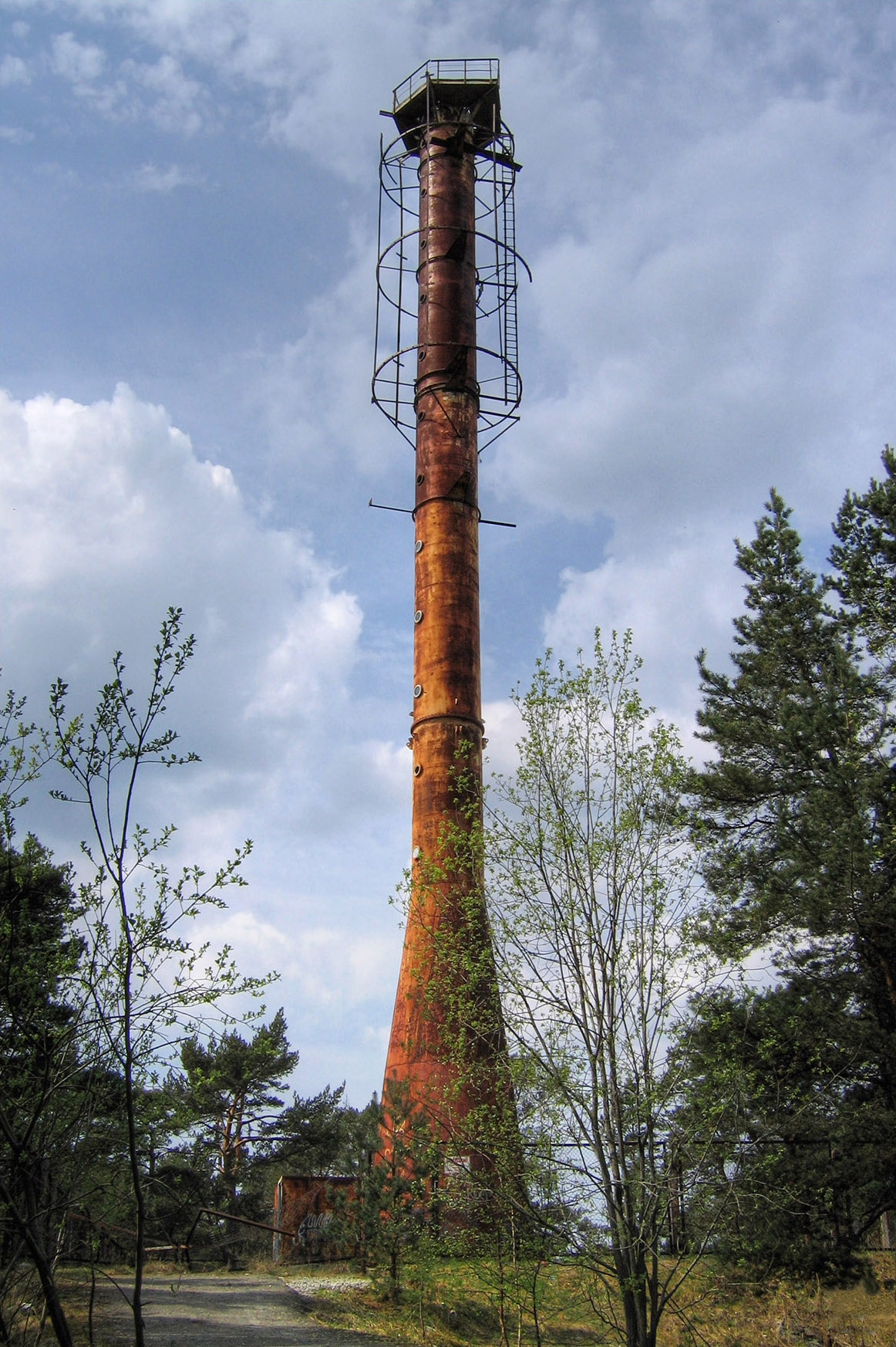
Ihasalu

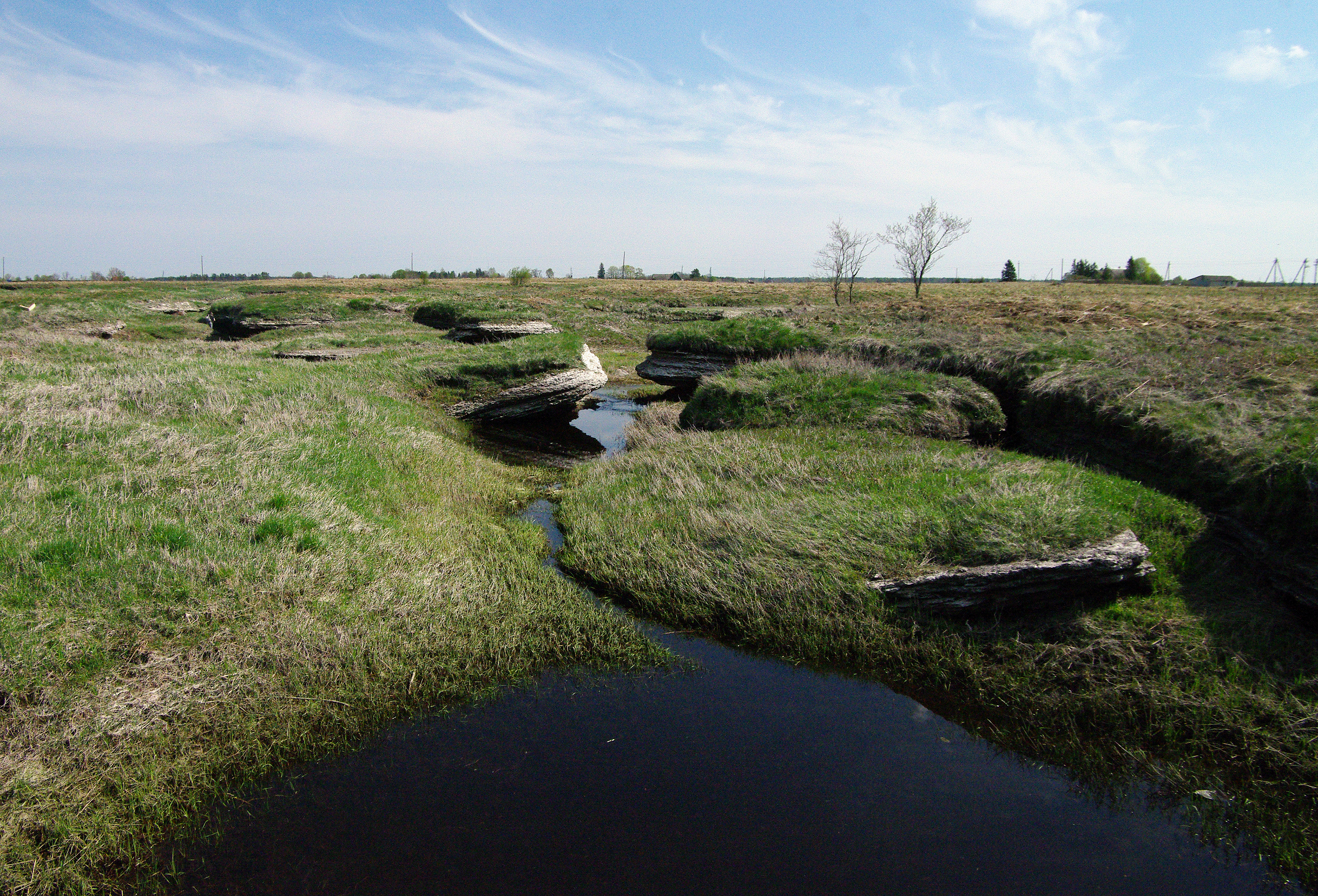
Kostivere

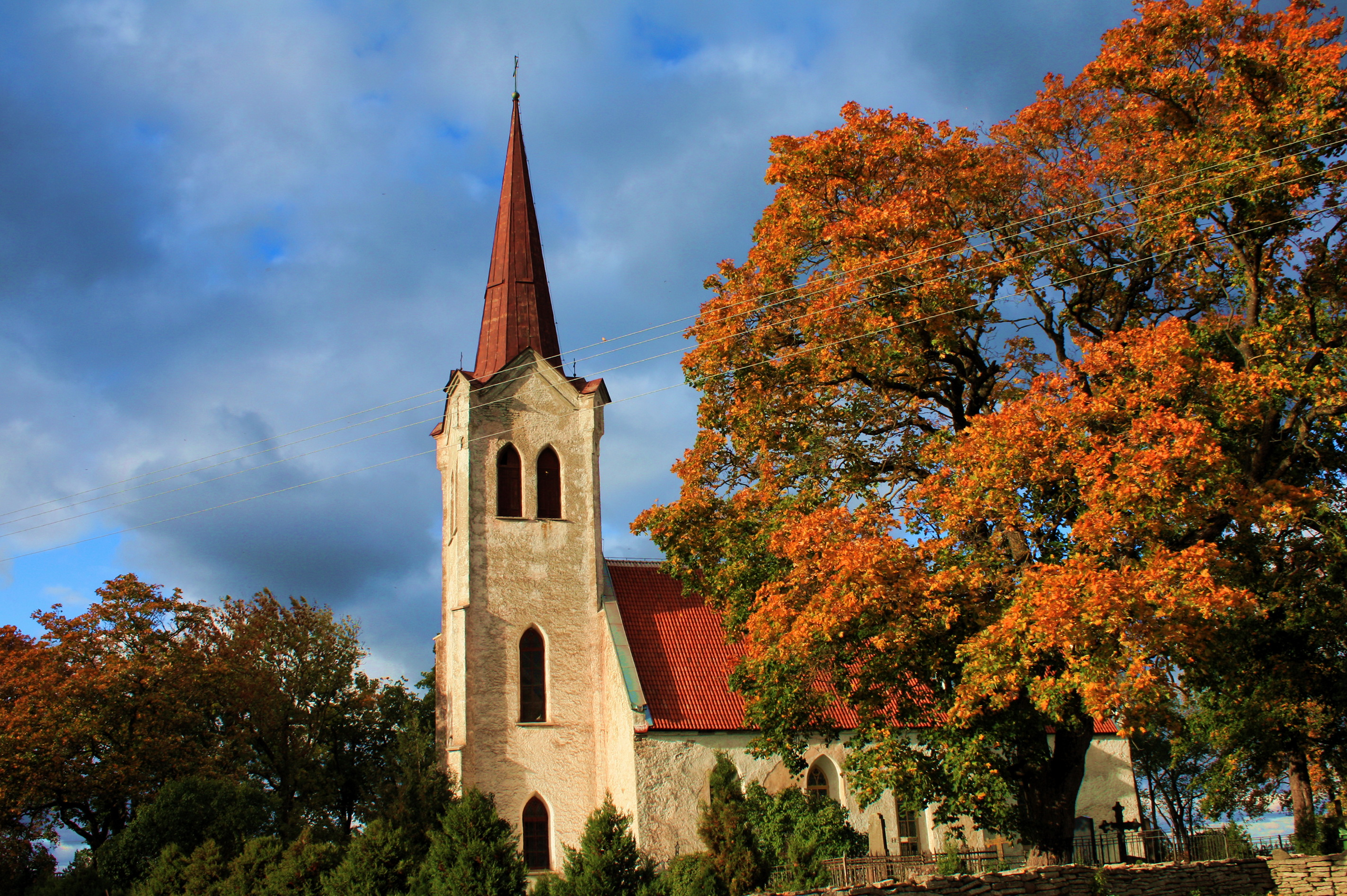
Jõelähtme church

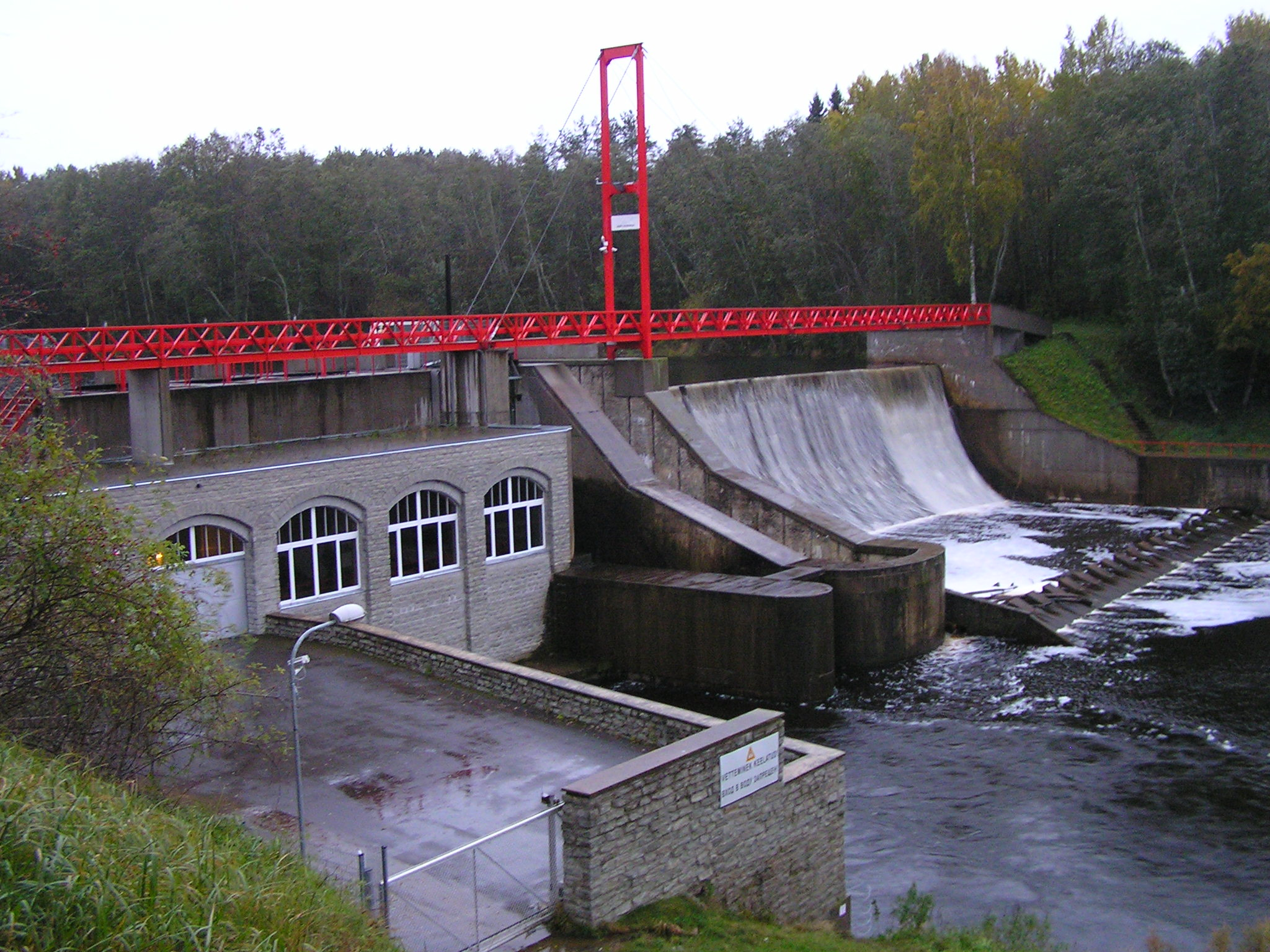
Linnamäe hydroelectric power plant

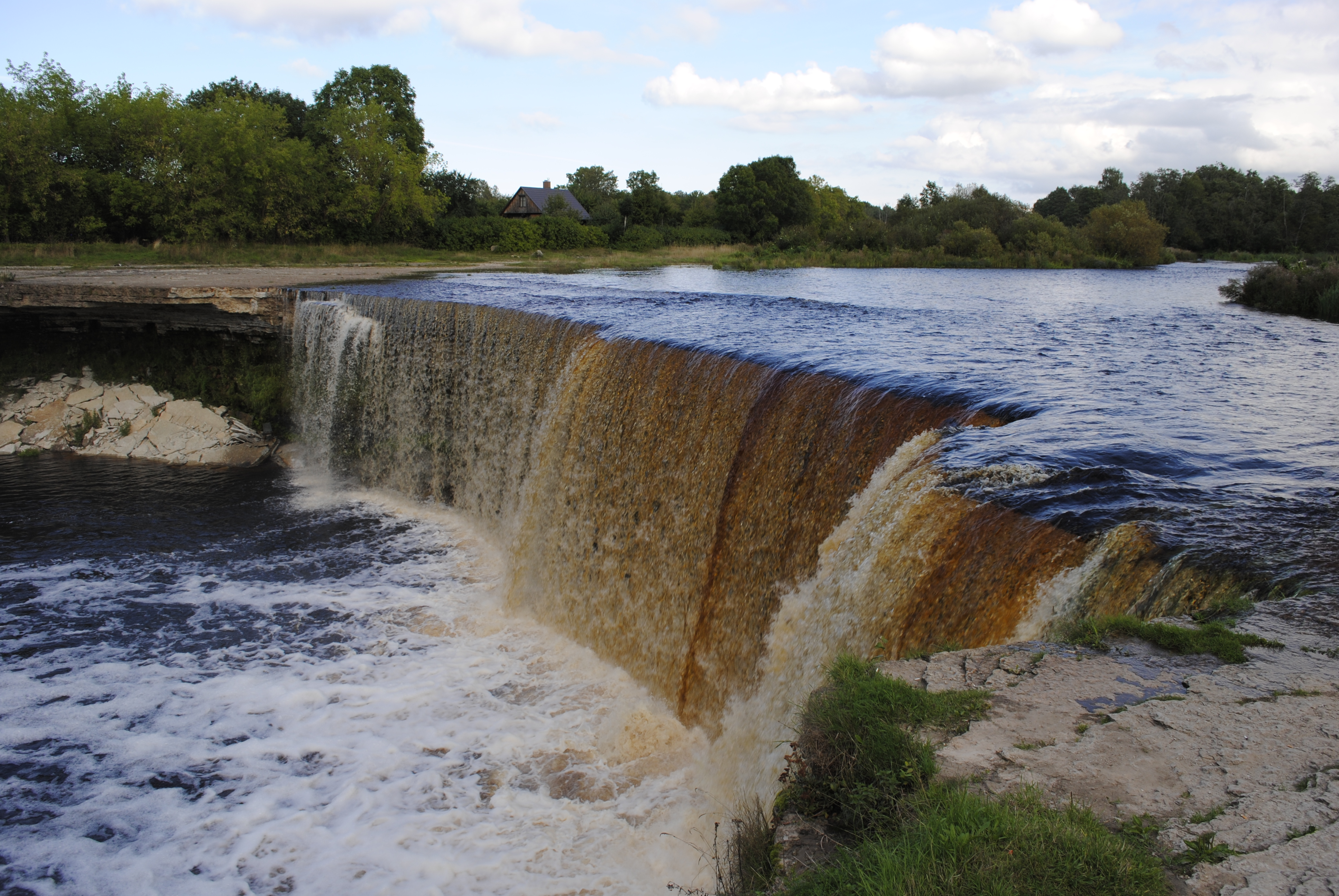
Jägala Falls

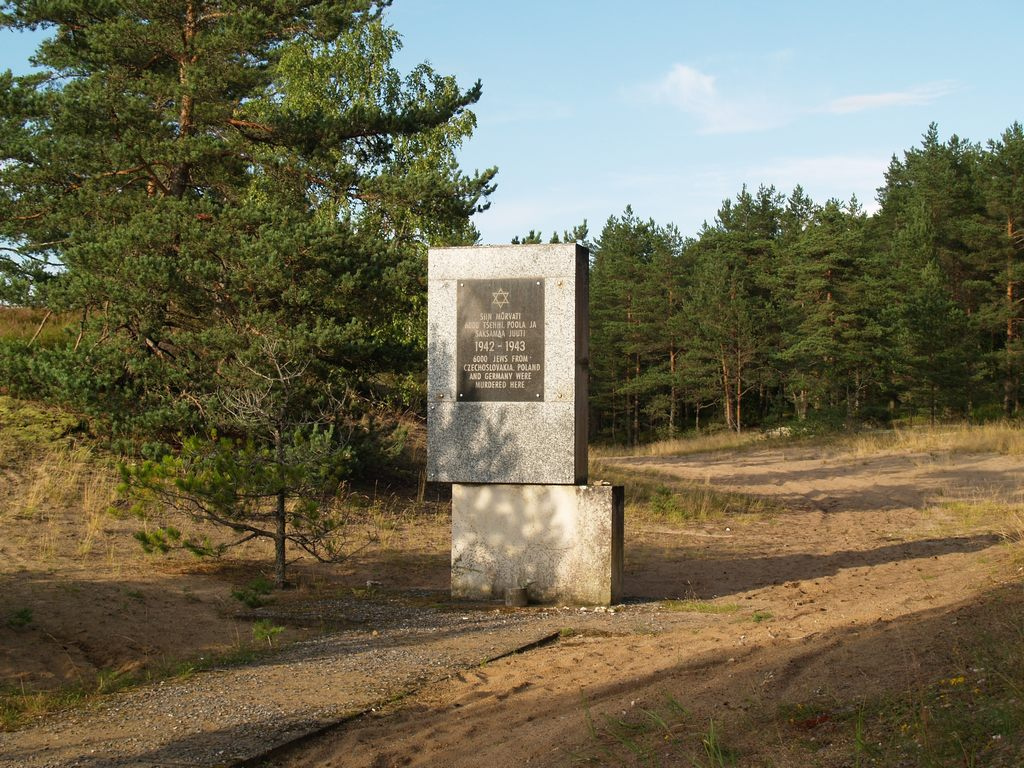
Memorial at Kalevi-Liiva

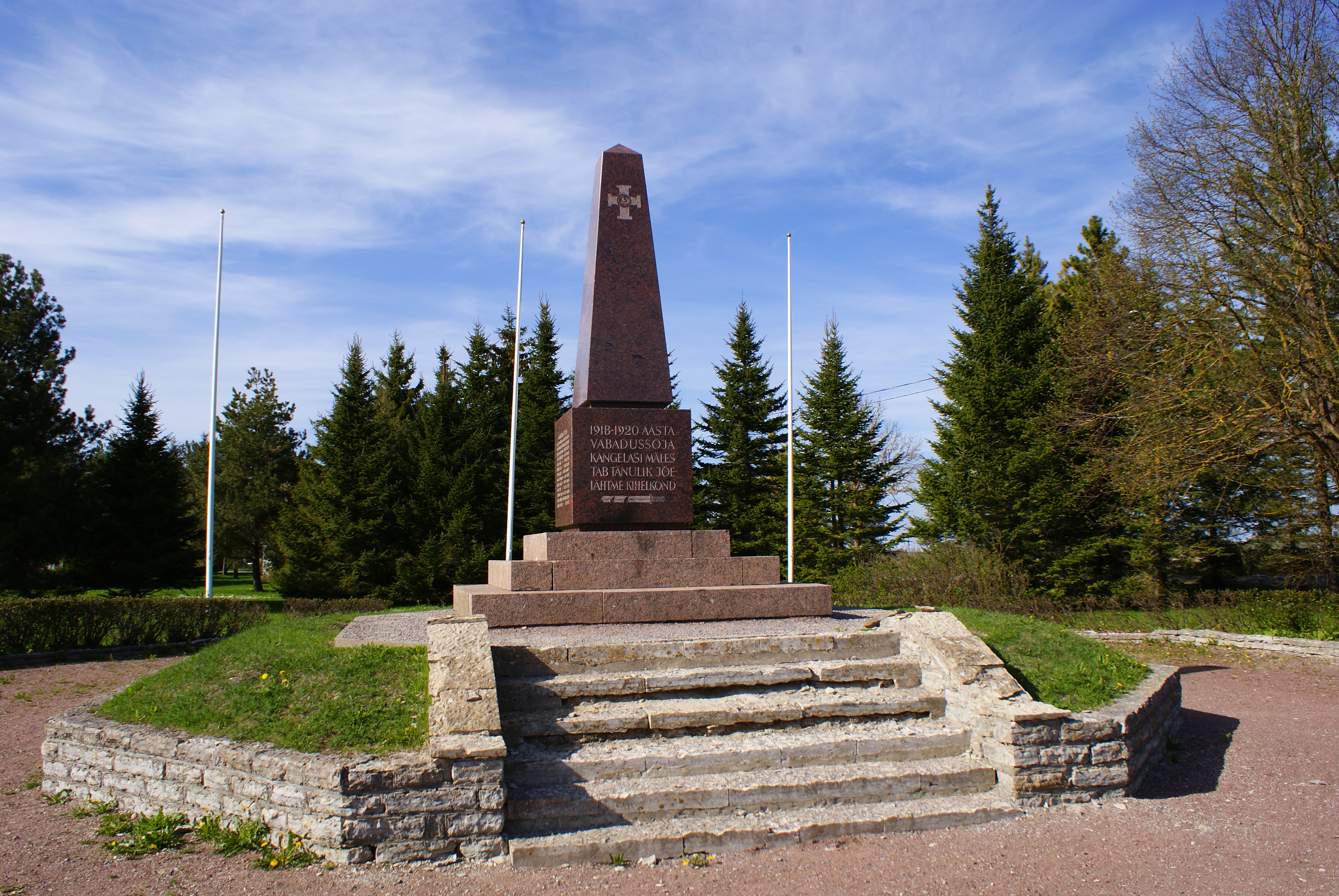
Monument to the Estonian War of Independence

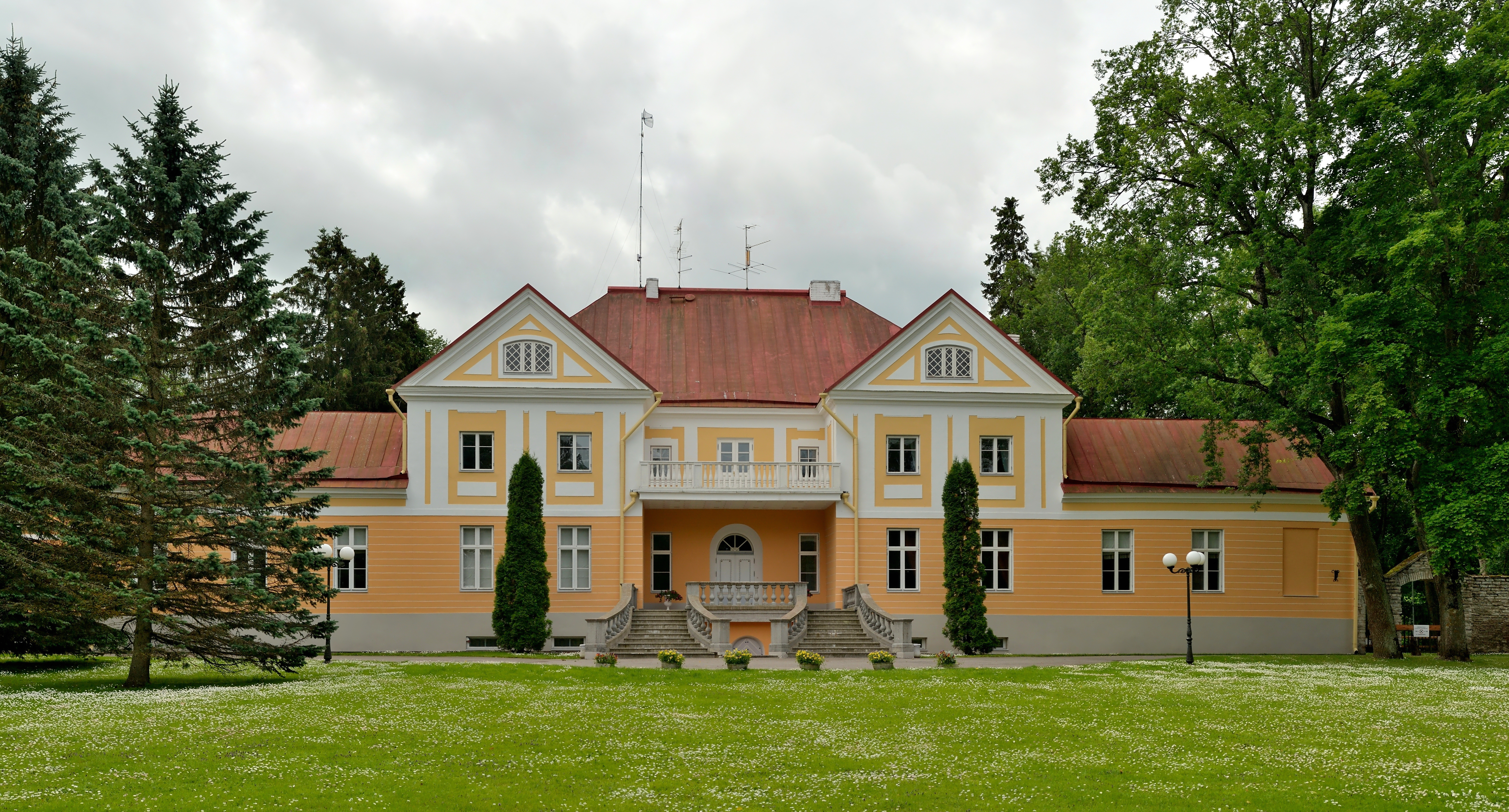
Maardu manor house

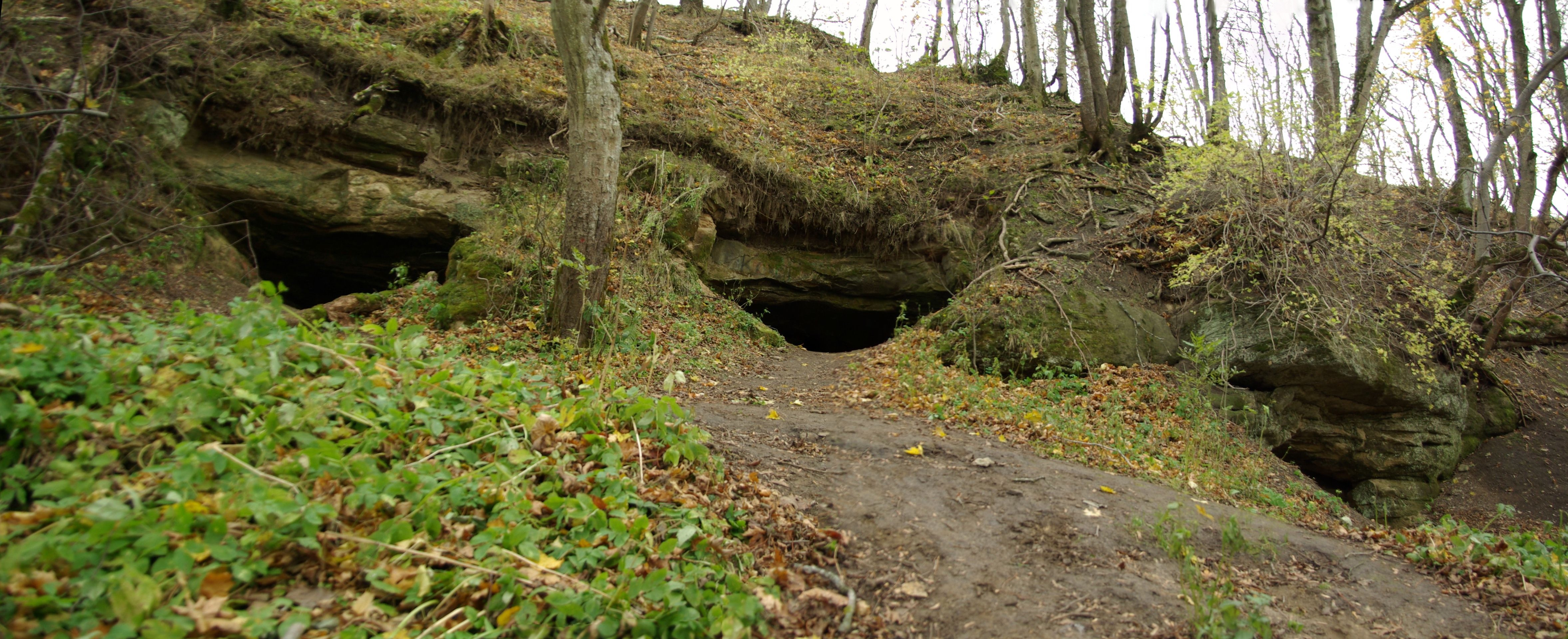
Ülgase caves

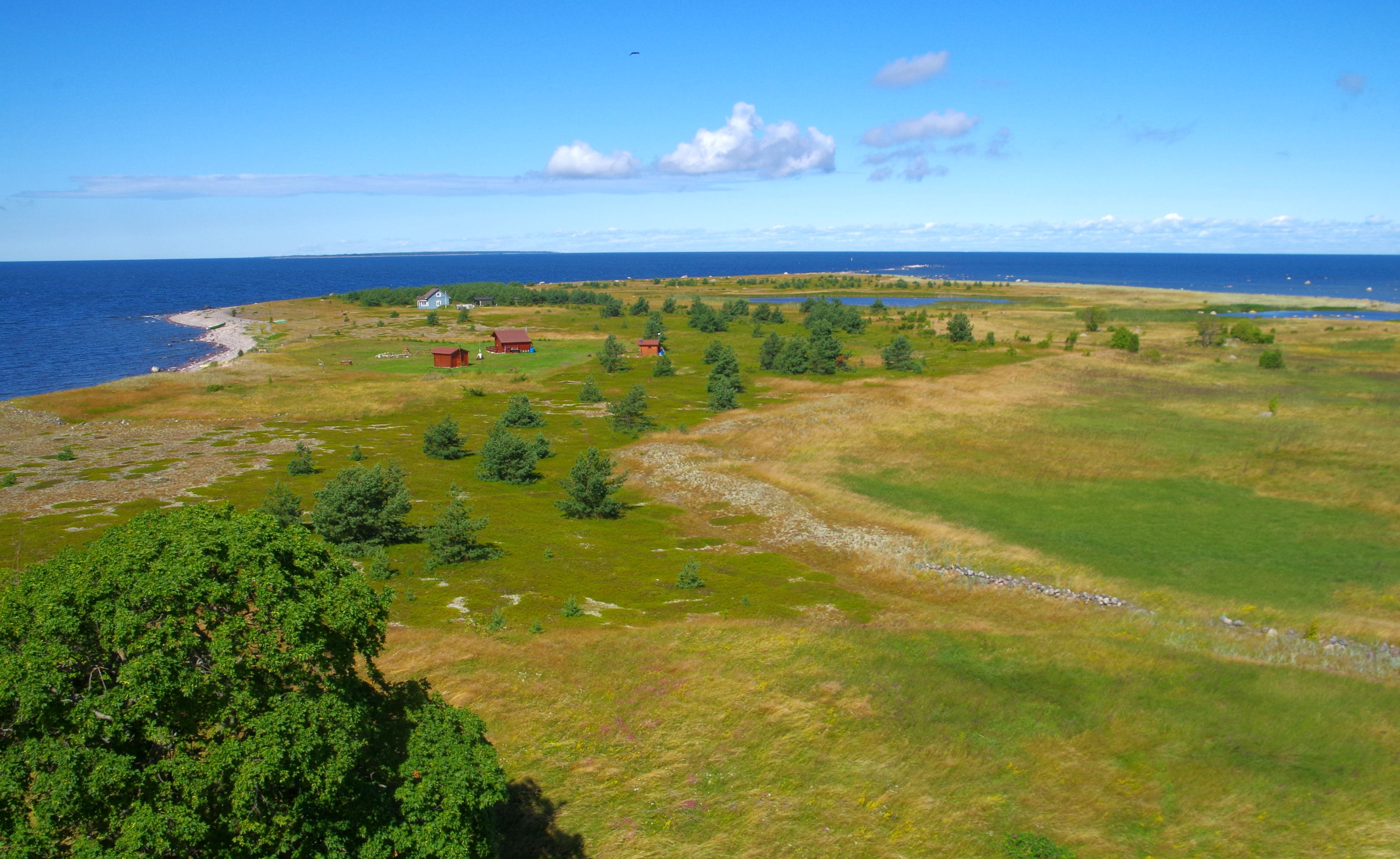
Rammu Island

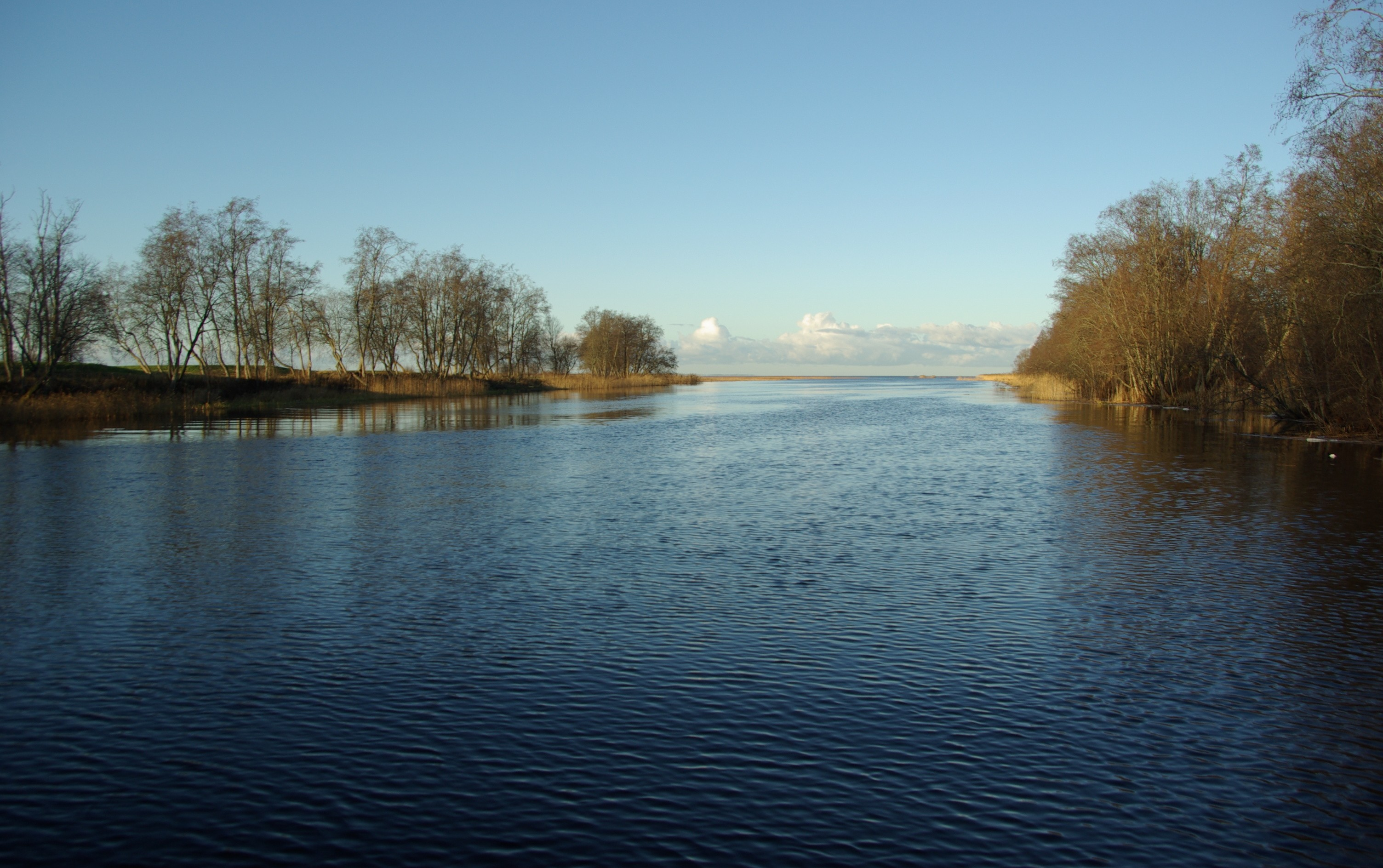
Mouth of the Jägala river

== Notable people ==
- Pontus Brevern-de la Gardie (1814 in Kostivere – 1890), a Swedish count, Baltic German nobleman, military officer and statesman
- Yevgenia Shakhovskaya-Glebova-Streshneva (1840 - 1924), philanthropist and Cavalry Lady
- Johannes Toom (1896 in Parasmäe – 1972), weightlifter, silver medallist at 1922 World Weightlifting Championships.
- Õie Orav (born 1934), film historian, screenwriter, actress and film director
