= Gretagrund =

Shallow in Estonia

- Gretagrund (Baltic Sea)
- Interactive map of Gretagrund

Geography
- Location: Gulf of Riga
- Coordinates: 57°44′30″N 23°18′00″E

Administration
- Estonia
- County: Saare County
- Municipality: Ruhnu Parish
- Settlement: Ruhnu village

Gretagrund (or Greta-Grund) is a shoal located a few km southeast of Ruhnu island in the Gulf of Riga, Estonia.

== Protected area ==
Since 12 August 2010 the 146.50 km^{2} (56.56 sq mi; 36,200 acres) water area was taken under protection as being a habitat for the following migratory birds: Black-throated loon (Gavia arctica), little gull (Larus minutus), red-throated loon (Gavia stellata), long-tailed duck (Clangula hyemalis), velvet scoter (Melanitta fusca) and razorbill (Alca torda). During a survey in 2008, Paramysis intermedia (from genus Paramysis) was found in Gretagrund as a new species in the Baltic Sea.
