= Pamma Landscape Conservation Area =

Protected area in Estonia

- Location within Estonia
- Location: Estonia
- Coordinates: 58°30′20″N 22°34′30″E
- Area: 8 ha (20 acres)
- Established: 1959 (2018)

Pamma Landscape Conservation Area is a nature park which is located in Saare County, Estonia.

The area of the nature park is 8 ha.

The protected area was founded in 1959 to protect landscapes and biodiversity in the villages of Pamma and Purtsa. In 2018, the protected area was designated to the landscape conservation area.
