= Lopi =

Lopi may refer to:

== Places ==
- Lõpi, Estonia

== Other ==
- Lopi (book), a former name of the 12th-century Lushi
- Luo Mi (罗泌; 1131–1203), the author of the Lushi
- Lopi language
- Lopi (knitting)
