= Gulf of Riga =

Bay of the Baltic Sea between Latvia and Estonia

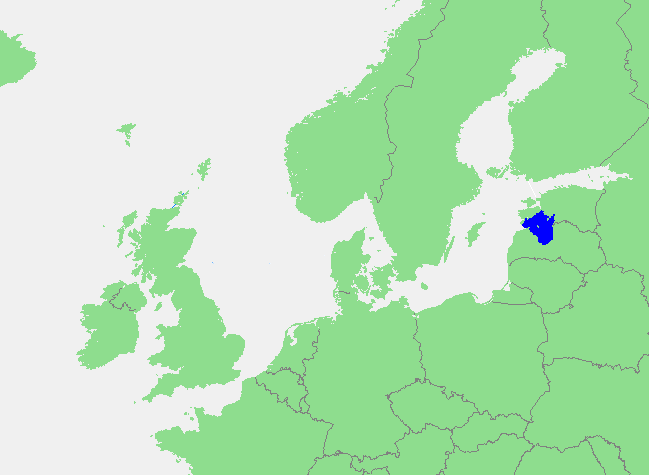
- Location in Northern Europe.

- Location within Latvia
- Location: Europe
- Coordinates: 57°45′N 23°30′E
- Primary inflows: Daugava, Pärnu, Lielupe, Gauja, Salaca
- Surface area: 18,000 km^{2} (6,900 sq mi)
- Average depth: 26 m (85 ft)
- Max. depth: 54 m (177 ft)
- Water volume: 424 km^{3} (344,000,000 acre⋅ft)
- Residence time: 30 years
- Frozen: Most or all during winter
- Settlements: Riga, Jūrmala, Pärnu, Kuressaare, Salacgrīva, Saulkrasti, Ainaži

The Gulf of Riga, (Note: Latvian: Rīgas līcis, IPA: [ˈriːgɐs ˈɫiːt͡sɪs]; Estonian: Liivi laht, IPA: [ˈliːvi lɑxt]; Livonian: Piški meŗ, lit. 'Small Sea'; German: Rigaischer Meerbusen; Latin: Sinus Rigensis) also known as the Bay of Riga or the Gulf of Livonia, is a bay of the Baltic Sea between Latvia and Estonia.

The island of Saaremaa (Estonia) partially separates it from the rest of the Baltic Sea. The main connection between the gulf and the Baltic Sea is the Irbe Strait.

The Gulf of Riga, as a sub-basin of the Baltic, also includes the Väinameri Sea in the West Estonian archipelago.

== Geography ==
The northern part of the Gulf of Riga is shallow, the southern part is slightly deeper. The deepest point is opposite Mērsrags (66 meters). In the central part of the gulf there is a bank, the highest threshold of which protrudes from the sea forms the island of Ruhnu.

=== Extent ===
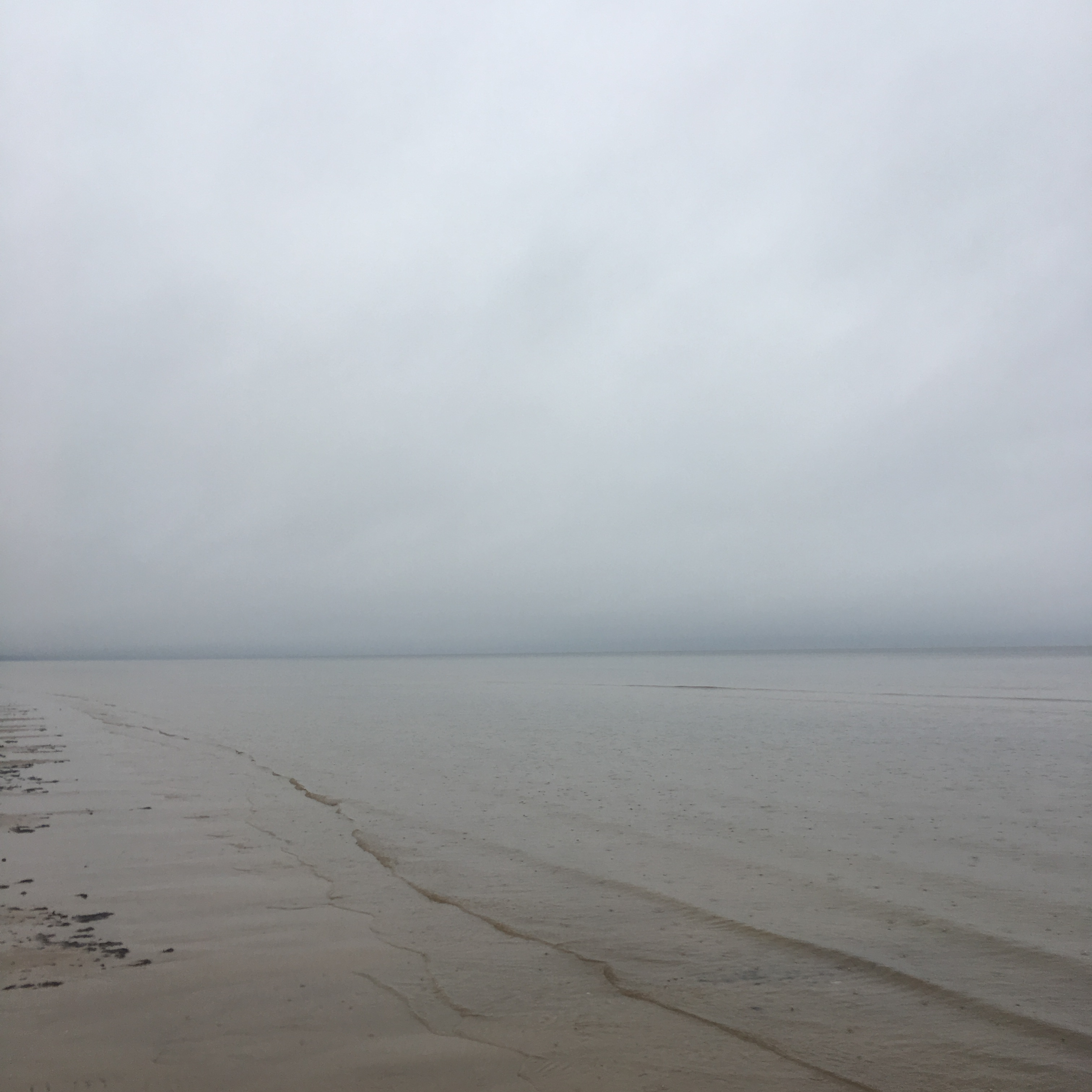
The Gulf of Riga as seen from Jūrmala, Latvia (January 2018).

The International Hydrographic Organization defines the Gulf of Riga's western limit as "A line running from Lyser Ort (57°34'N), in Latvia, to the South extreme of Saaremaa, through this island to Pammana (22°34'E), thence to Emmaste Point, the S extreme of Hiiumaa, through Hiiumaa to Tahkuna Point, the North extreme thereof, and on to Spithamn Point in Estonia".

=== Islands ===
Major islands in the gulf include Saaremaa, Kihnu, and Ruhnu, which are all in Estonian territory. Kihnu covers an area of 16.4 square kilometres (6.3 sq mi). Saaremaa island is responsible for the brackish water of the Gulf of Riga, as it is partially "shielded" from the Baltic Sea. The Baltic itself is already less salty than the global oceanic average, but this effect has a north–south and east–west gradient.

=== Cities ===
Notable cities around the gulf include Riga and Jūrmala in Latvia, and Pärnu and Kuressaare in Estonia. The main rivers flowing into the gulf are Daugava, Pärnu, Lielupe, Gauja, and Salaca.

== Salinity ==
The freshwater runoff entering the Baltic sea accounts for two percent of its volume. A narrow connection to the North Sea means that water stays in the Baltic for an average of 30 years. These two characteristics work to make the Baltic Sea one of the largest brackish bodies of water in the world. The Gulf of Riga has an average salt concentration for the Baltic Sea, which is around six to ten parts per thousand. Freshwater has a concentration of 0.5 parts per thousand, and seawater is about 30 parts per thousand.

== Seasons ==
The surface water layer of the Gulf of Riga has relatively large annual temperature fluctuations. In mid-summer, in July and August, the surface water layer temperature in the central part of the bay is 18°C. On the low coast, the water can warm up to 25–26°C on hot and sunny days in mid-summer. The deeper water layers are noticeably cooler, but the temperature changes less throughout the year. In winter, most or all of the Bay occasionally freezes. This is due to low salinity and the calming effect of the partial closure of the entrance of the gulf. During the winter, many people walk over the bay. The thickest recorded ice was 90 centimetres (2 ft 11 in) thick in the winter of 1941–42. Ice hole fishing has been a traditional source of winter food, and remains a common activity. The ice usually melts between March and April. In late March 2013, when the ice started to melt, 200 people had to be rescued from ice floes.

== See also ==
- Battle of the Gulf of Riga
- Gretagrund
- Pärnu Bay
