= Nõmme, Saaremaa Parish =

Village in Estonia

Coordinates: 58°29′46″N 22°38′06″E

Nõmme
- Village
- Interactive map of Nõmme
- Country: Estonia
- County: Saare County
- Parish: Saaremaa Parish
- Time zone: UTC+2 (EET)
  - Summer (DST): UTC+3 (EEST)

Nõmme is a village in Saaremaa Parish, Saare County in western Estonia.

Before the administrative reform in 2017, the village was in Leisi Parish.

== Name ==
The village of Nõmme is named after the Nõmme farm, which was originally part of the neighboring village of Pamma. The farm was attested in historical sources as Nömma Hanß in 1645 and Nemme Hans in 1731, referring to peasants living there. The name comes from the common noun nõmm (genitive: nõmme) 'heath, moor, moorland', referring to the local geography. Locally, the village is known as Nömme.

== Notable people ==
Notable people that were born or lived in Nõmme:

- Gustav Ränk (1902-1998), ethnologist
