= Tutku =

Tutku may refer to:

== Places ==
- Tutku, Estonia, a village in Saaremaa Parish, Saare County, Estonia

== People ==
- Tutku Açık (born 1980), Turkish basketball player
- Tutku Burcu Yüzgenç (born 1999), Turkish volleyball pkayer

== Others ==
- Tutkusu, Turkish studio album by Erkin Koray
