= Tareste Landscape Conservation Area =

Nature park in Estonia

- Location within Estonia
- Location: Estonia
- Coordinates: 59°01′N 22°42′E
- Area: 455 ha (1,120 acres)
- Established: 2007

Tareste Landscape Conservation Area is a nature park which is located in Hiiu County, Estonia.

The area of the nature park is 455 ha.

The protected area was founded in 2007 to protect landscapes and biodiversity in Tareste village and Kärdla town.
