= Külma =

Külma may refer to several places in Estonia:

- Külma, Saare County, village in Estonia
- Külma, Võru County, village in Estonia
