= Wittrock =

Wittrock is a surname of North German origin. People with the surname include:

- Carl Wittrock (born 1966), Dutch composer, conductor, and musician
- Finn Wittrock (born 1984), American actor and screenwriter
- Hugo Wittrock (1873–1958), Baltic German merchant and political figure
- Merlin Wittrock (1931–2007), American educational psychologist
- Veit Brecher Wittrock (1839–1914), Swedish botanist
