= Laugu-Liiva =

Village in Estonia

Coordinates: 58°33′31″N 22°35′58″E

- Village
- Interactive map of Laugu-Liiva
- Country: Estonia
- County: Saare County
- Parish: Saaremaa Parish
- Time zone: UTC+2 (EET)
  - Summer (DST): UTC+3 (EEST)

Laugu-Liiva (Liiva until 2017) is a village in Saaremaa Parish, Saare County in western Estonia.

Before the administrative reform in 2017, the village was in Leisi Parish.
