= Gustav Ränk =

Estonian ethnologist

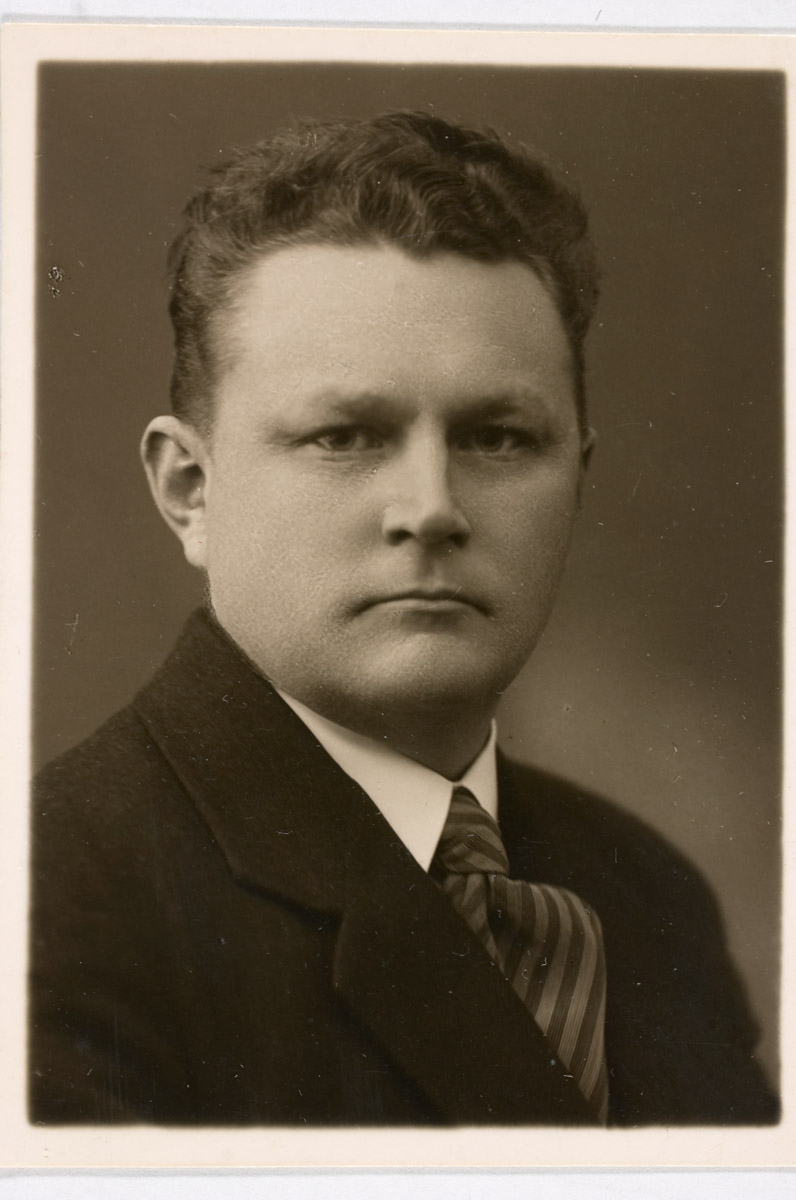
- Gustav Ränk, 1938
- Born: 18 February 1902; Nõmme, Estonia
- Died: 5 April 1998; Stockholm, Sweden

Academic background
- Education: University of Tartu

Gustav Ränk (18 February 1902 − 5 April 1998) was an Estonian ethnologist who was Professor of Ethnography at the University of Tartu, Director of the Estonian National Museum and Associate Professor of Ethnology at Stockholm University.

== Biography ==
Gustav Ränk was born on a farm in Nõmme on the island of Saaremaa on 18 February 1902. Earning his doctorate from the University of Tartu in 1938, Ränk was subsequently appointed Professor of Ethnography at the University of Tartu. He was simultaneously Director of the Estonian National Museum. In 1944, during the Baltic Offensive which led to the Occupation of the Baltic states, Ränk supervised the evacuation of collections from the University of Tartu, the Estonian National Museum and other Tartu research institutions, ensuring that invaluable material was saved for Estonian scholarship.

Ränk fled to Sweden in autumn 1944, and in 1955 was appointed Associate Professor of Ethnology at Stockholm University. He retired in 1969. Ränk was awarded the Order of the National Coat of Arms, 4th Class in 1998. He died in Stockholm on 5 April 1998.

He was an honorary alumnus of the Estonian Students' Society.
