= Veske =

Village in Estonia

Coordinates: 58°33′N 22°41′E

- Village
- Interactive map of Veske
- Country: Estonia
- County: Saare County
- Parish: Saaremaa Parish
- Time zone: UTC+2 (EET)
  - Summer (DST): UTC+3 (EEST)

Veske is a village in Saaremaa Parish, Saare County, on the island of Saaremaa Estonia.

Before the administrative reform in 2017, the village was in Leisi Parish.
