= Hugo Wittrock =

Latvian politician (1873–1958)

Mayor of Riga
- In office 1941 – September 1944
- Preceded by: Arnolds Deglavs
- Succeeded by: Arnolds Deglavs

Personal details
- Born: 7 July 1873 Laugu, Governorate of Estonia, Russian Empire
- Died: 25 August 1958 (aged 85) Lübeck, Schleswig-Holstein, West Germany

Hugo Wittrock (7 July 1873 – 25 August 1958) was a Baltic German merchant and political figure who served as Lord Mayor of Riga during the German occupation of Latvia.

== Biography ==
Wittrock was born in Laugu in the Estonian Governorate of the Russian Empire in 1873 to a German father from Holstein and an Estonian mother. He studied at the Riga Polytechnical Institute and afterwards founded his own insurance company. When German troops captured Riga following the Battle of Jugla in 1917, he took on an advisory role in urban affairs for the occupying authorities. After the war, he fled to Germany, but returned to Latvia to continue running his insurance company. He was president of the Riga Trade Association from 1931 to 1936, when he retired to Königsberg.

In 1941, when the Germans invaded Latvia, he returned to Riga again and was appointed Mayor of the city at the behest of his son-in-law Alfred Rosenberg, who was the Reich Minister for the Occupied Eastern Territories. As he was a Latvian citizen, Wittrock was not eligible for membership in the NSDAP, thus making him the only area commissioner who was not a party member. During his tenure as mayor, Wittrock engaged in an aggressive Germanization campaign which included renaming streets and buildings after historical and contemporary German celebrities, including Adolf Hitler and Hermann Göring. Under his direction, Riga became the center of the Nazi administration in the Baltic, and was characterized as an exclusively German city. Despite his status as mayor, however, he did not learn of the extermination of Jews within the city's ghetto until it had already taken place. He fled with the retreating German troops in September 1944 and returned to Germany, where he spent the remainder of his life.

In 1950, Wittrock published a memoir, entitled An Eventful Life: Memoirs of a German Balt. He died following a traffic accident in Lübeck in August 1958.

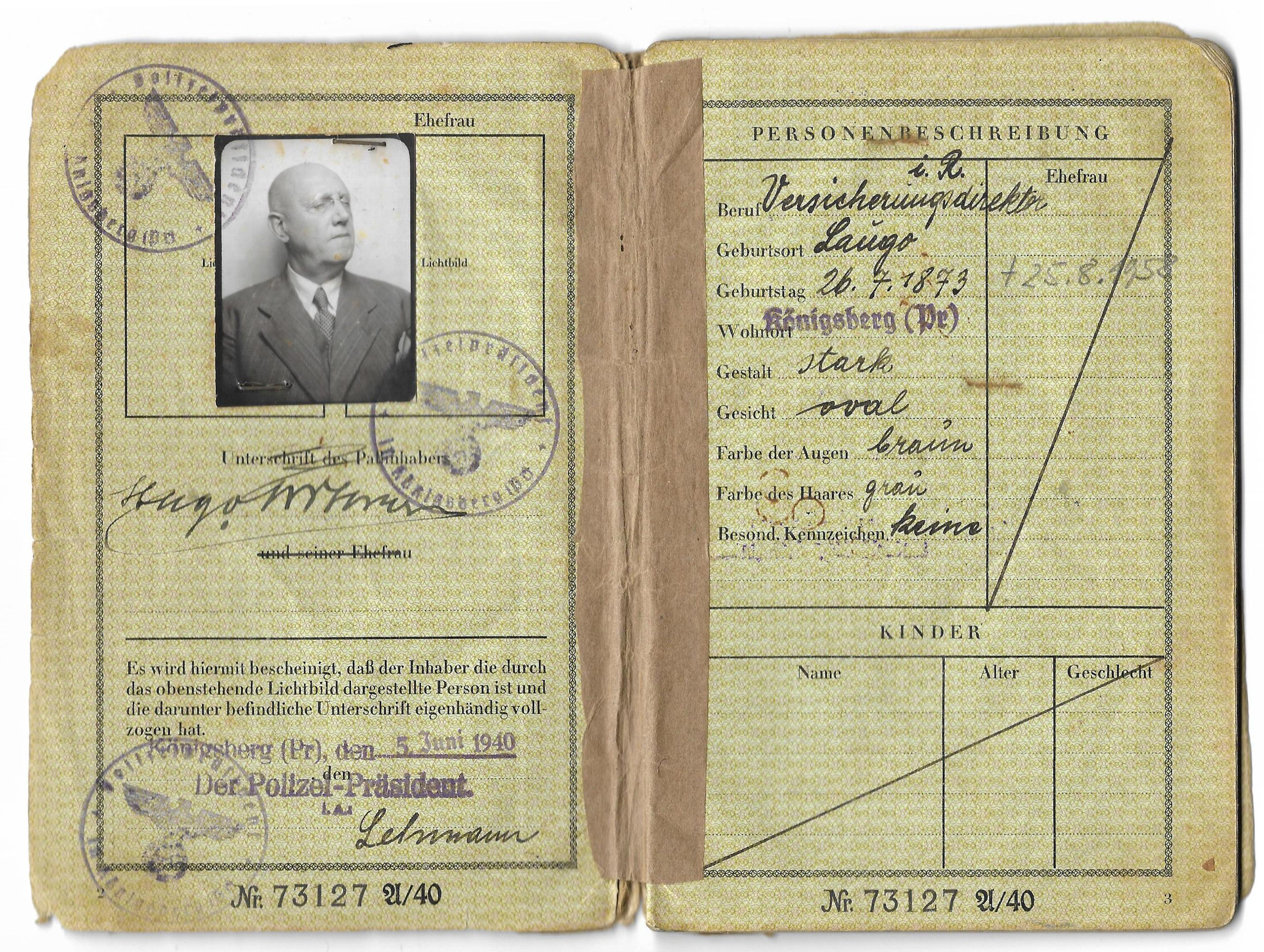
1940 Hugo Wittrock's wartime German passport issued to him before becoming the mayor of Riga.
