= Metsküla, Saare County =

Village in Estonia

Coordinates: 58°34′38″N 22°32′16″E

Metsküla
- Village
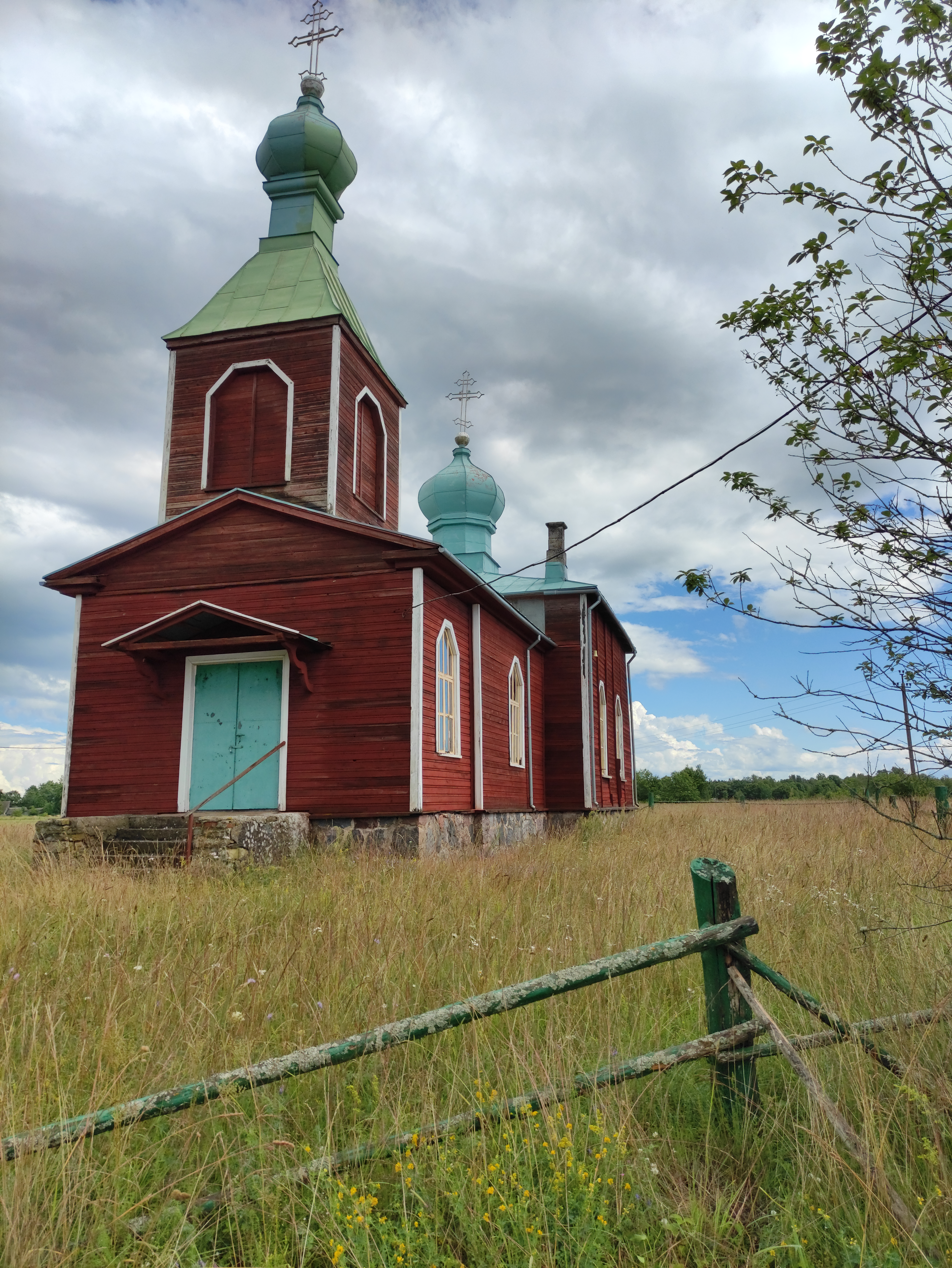
- Metsküla Saaremaa Estonia.jpg
- Interactive map of Metsküla
- Country: Estonia
- County: Saare County
- Parish: Saaremaa Parish
- Time zone: UTC+2 (EET)
  - Summer (DST): UTC+3 (EEST)

Metsküla is a village in Saaremaa Parish, Saare County in western Estonia.

Before the administrative reform in 2017, the village was in Leisi Parish.
