= Paramysis bakuensis =

Scientific classification
- Kingdom: Animalia
- Phylum: Arthropoda
- Class: Malacostraca
- Order: Mysida
- Family: Mysidae
- Genus: Paramysis
- Species: P. bakuensis

Binomial name
- Paramysis bakuensis G. O. Sars, 1895

Species of crustacean

Paramysis bakuensis is a species of mysid crustacean from the family Mysidae, named by the locality from where it was originally described, the town of Baku in Azerbaijan by the Caspian Sea.

== Taxonomic history ==
After the description by Norwegian carcinologist Georg Ossian Sars, the species was mentioned only twice among the mysids of the Sea of Azov basin, but soon synonymized with Paramysis baeri. In 60 years it was rediscovered while combined morphological and molecular revision of P. baeri, restored and redescribed.

== Distribution ==
The species is distributed throughout brackish and fresh waters of the Ponto-Caspian basin. It is found in the Caspian Sea, the Sea of Azov, rivers Volga, Don, Kuban and Danube; in the rivers up to over 500 km upstream. All the previous mentionings of P. baeri outside the Caspian Sea should probably be attributed to P. bakuensis. The ranges of P. bakuensis and P. baeri partly overlap: they can be found together in the Caspian Sea.

== Habitat ==
Paramysis bakuensis is a coastal sublittoral species in the sea, found at the depth below 10 m (33 ft), preferably on sandy or sandy-muddy bottom. In the rivers of the Ponto-Caspian basin it lives usually in the riverbed with constant stream and high oxygenation.

== Characters ==
Body length 13–31 millimetres (0.51–1.22 in). Can be distinguished from P. baeri by wide, but not wider than long exopod of maxilla 2, smooth paradactylar claw-setae of pereiopods 6 and other characters.
