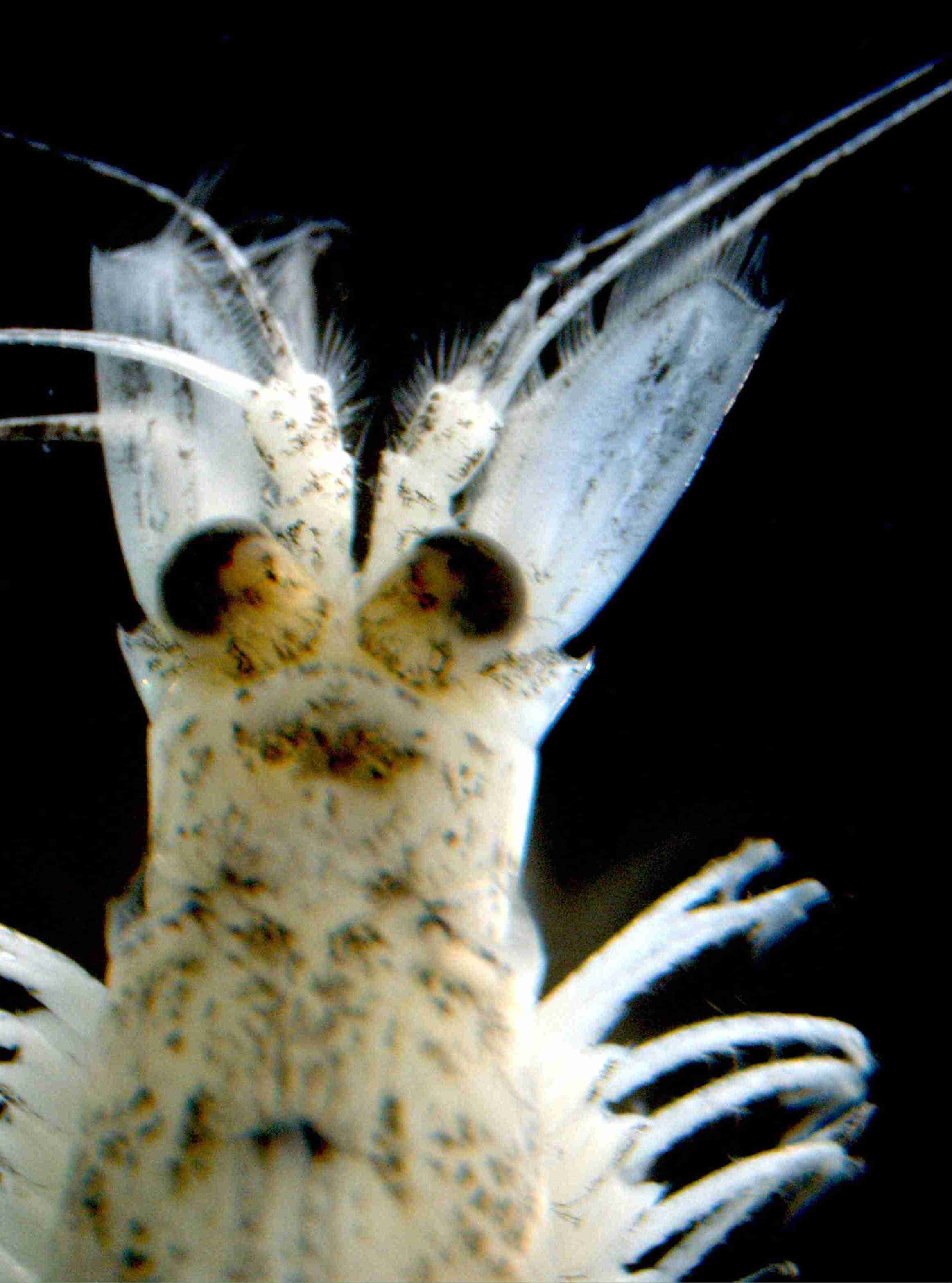
- Head

Scientific classification
- Kingdom: Animalia
- Phylum: Arthropoda
- Clade: Pancrustacea
- Class: Malacostraca
- Order: Mysida
- Family: Mysidae
- Genus: Paramysis
- Species: P. baeri

Binomial name
- Paramysis baeri Czerniavsky, 1882

= Paramysis baeri =

Species of crustacean

Paramysis baeri is a species of mysid crustacean from the genus Paramysis, named in honour of the prominent biologist Karl Ernst von Baer. Its body is 13–31 millimetres (0.51–1.22 in) long, and it is only found in the coastal waters of the Caspian Sea, on sandy and muddy bottoms, at depths of less than 20 m (66 ft). For over a century, it was thought to be distributed throughout the whole Ponto-Caspian basin, but recently the range was reconsidered after the rediscovery and re-establishment of the closely related species Paramysis bakuensis. Since the taxonomic status of P. baeri has been reconsidered, the distribution and ecology of the species remain poorly known. Paramysis baeri can be distinguished from P. bakuensis and other species of the subgenus Paramysis s. str. by the rather broad, almost quadrangular exopod of maxilla 2, the strongly serrated paradactylar claw-setae of pereiopod 6, and other features.
