= Leisi =

Village in Estonia

- Small borough
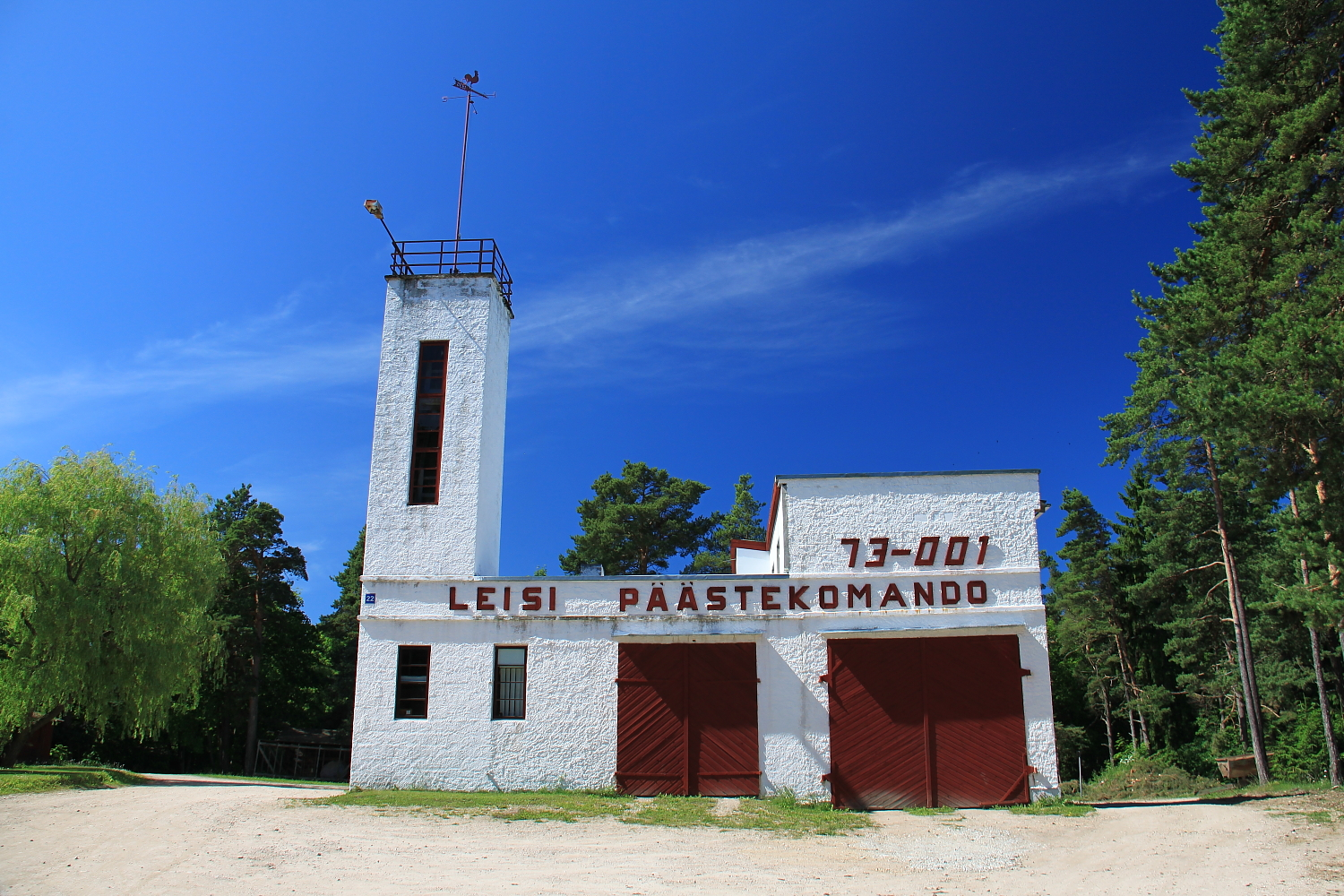
- Leisi fire station

- Location within Estonia
- Coordinates: 58°34′17″N 22°41′02″E
- Country: Estonia
- County: Saare County
- Parish: Saaremaa Parish
- Time zone: UTC+2 (EET)
  - Summer (DST): UTC+3 (EEST)

Leisi (German: Laisberg) is a small borough (Estonian: alevik) in Saaremaa Parish, Saare County in western Estonia. It is the centre of Leisi district (osavald) of Saaremaa Parish.

Before the administrative reform in 2017, the borough was the administrative centre of Leisi Parish.

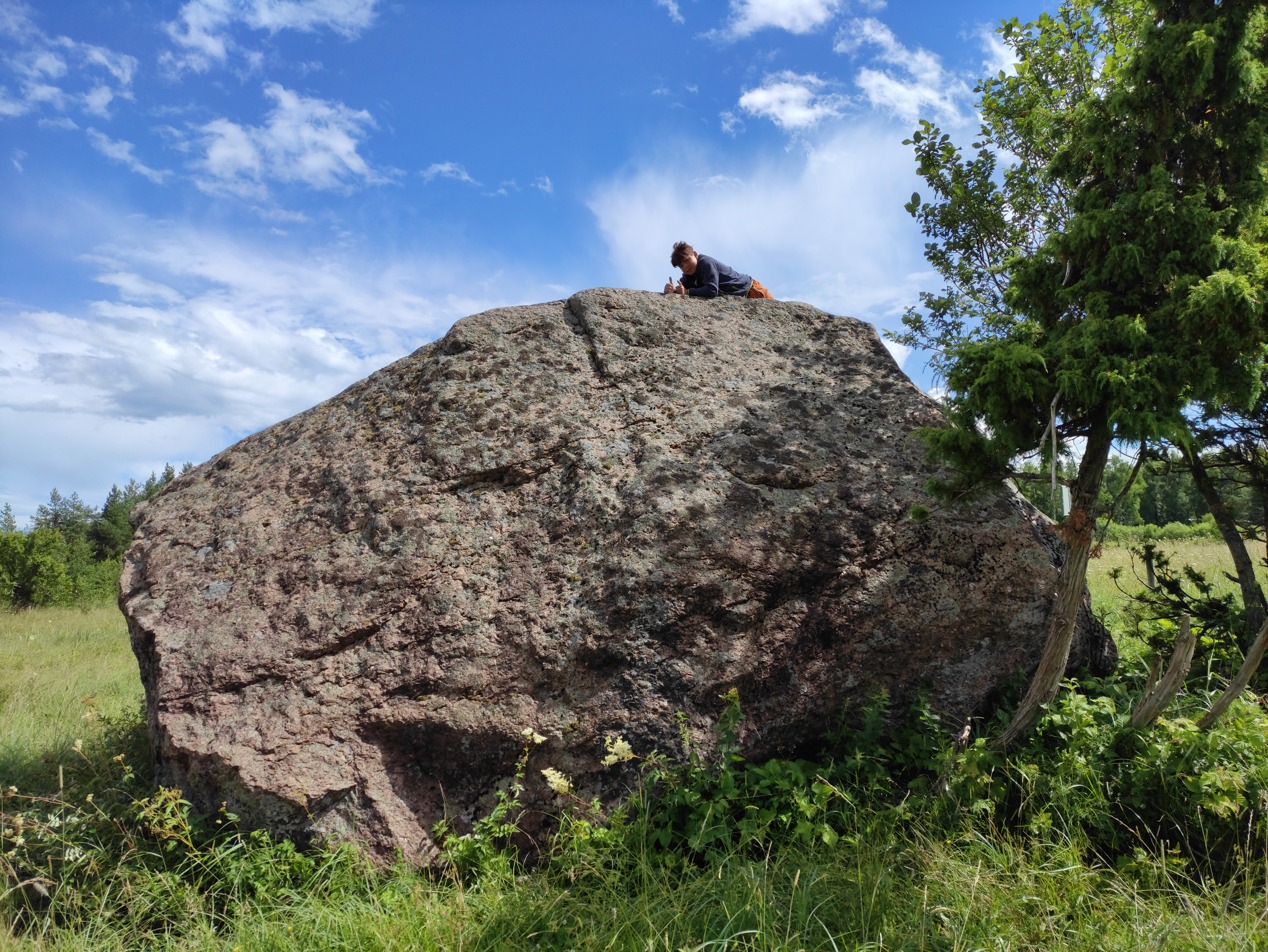
Võlupe Glacial Erratic stone (Võlupe rändrahn)
