= Leisi Parish =

Former municipality of Estonia

Coordinates: 58°34′14″N 22°41′49″E

Leisi Parish Leisi vald
- Former municipality of Estonia
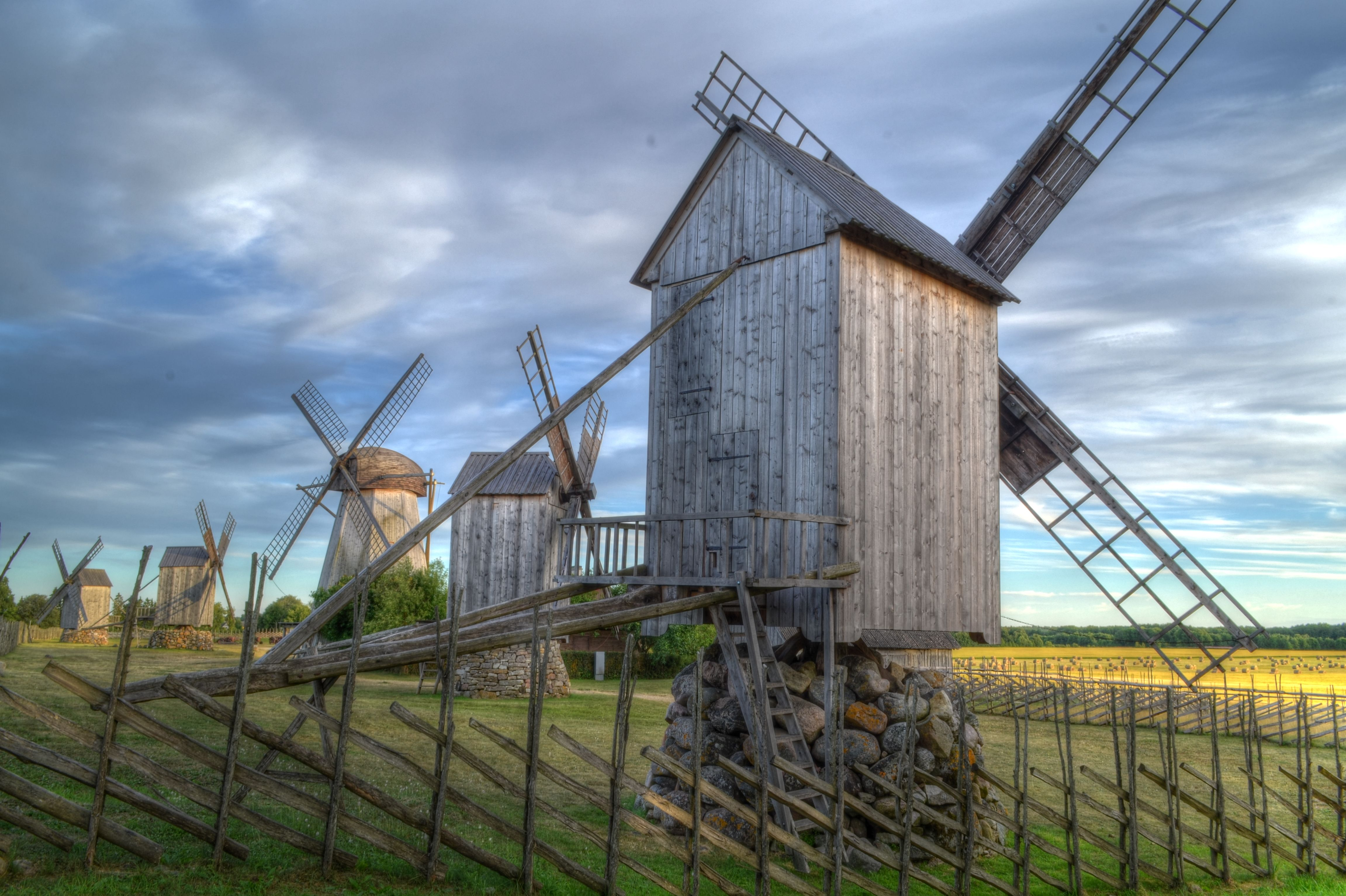
- Angla windmills

- Flag Coat of arms

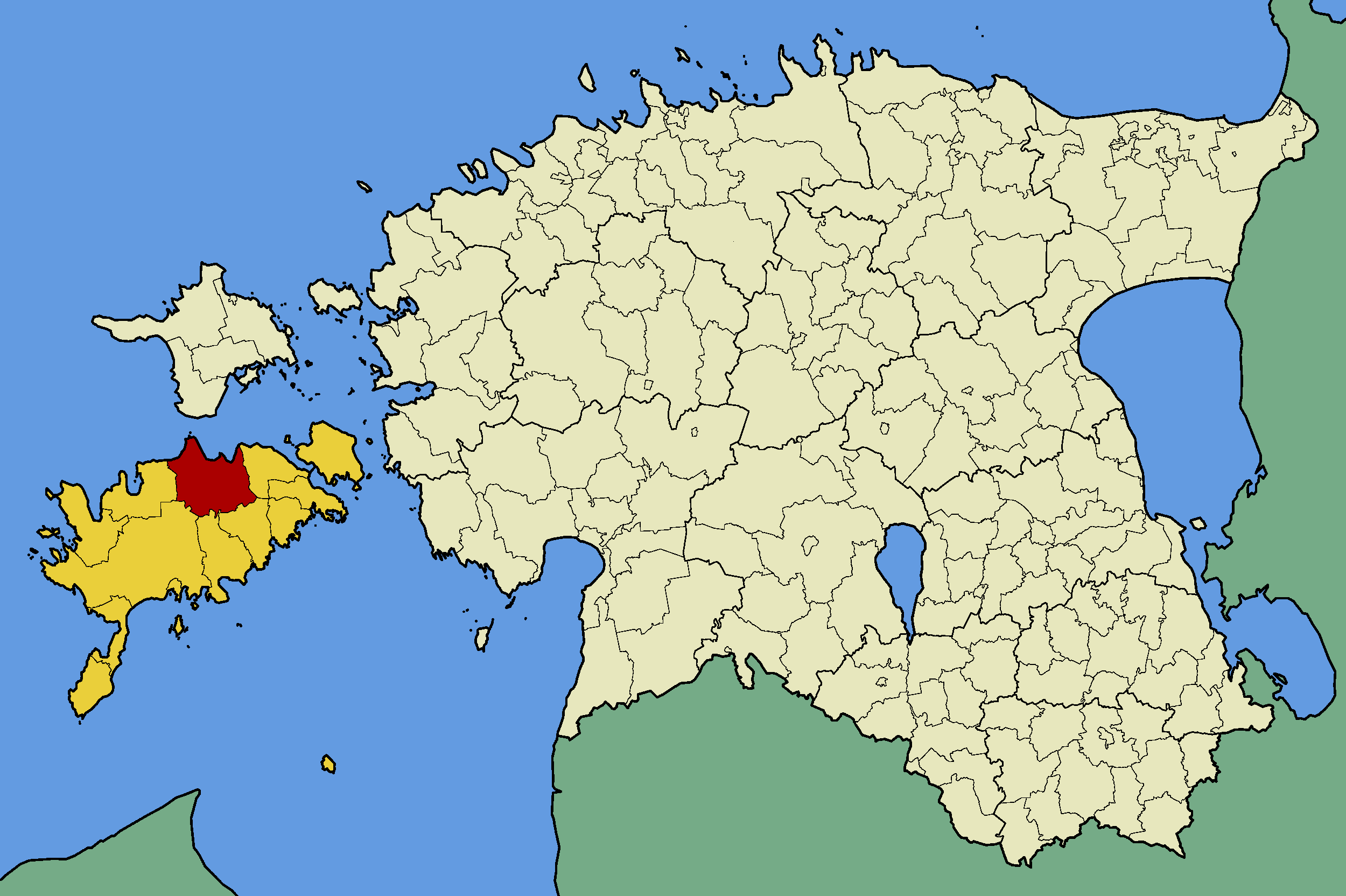
- Leisi Parish within Saare County.
- Country: Estonia
- County: Saare County
- Administrative centre: Leisi

Area
  - Total: 347.91 km^{2} (134.33 sq mi)

Population (01.01.2010)
  - Total: 2,137
  - Density: 6.142/km^{2} (15.91/sq mi)
- Website: www.leisivald.ee

Leisi Parish was a municipality in Saare County, Estonia.

The parish consisted of one small borough Leisi and 53 villages. The municipality had a population of 2,137 (as of 1 January 2010) and covered an area of 347.91 km².

During the administrative-territorial reform in 2017, all 12 municipalities on the island of Saaremaa were merged into a single municipality – Saaremaa Parish.

== Settlements ==
Small borough

Leisi

Villages

Angla - Aru - Aruste - Asuka - Hiievälja - Jõiste - Kaisa - Karja - Koiduvälja - Koikla - Kopli - Külma - Laugu - Liiva - Linnaka - Linnuse - Lõpi - Luulupe - Mätja - Meiuste - Metsaääre - Metsküla - Moosi - Mujaste - Murika - Nava - Nihatu - Nõmme - Nurme - Õeste - Oitme - Paaste - Pamma - Pammana - Parasmetsa - Pärsama - Peederga - Pöitse - Poka - Purtsa - Räägi - Ratla - Roobaka - Selja - Soela - Täätsi - Tareste - Tiitsuotsa - Tõre - Triigi - Tutku - Veske - Viira

== Images ==
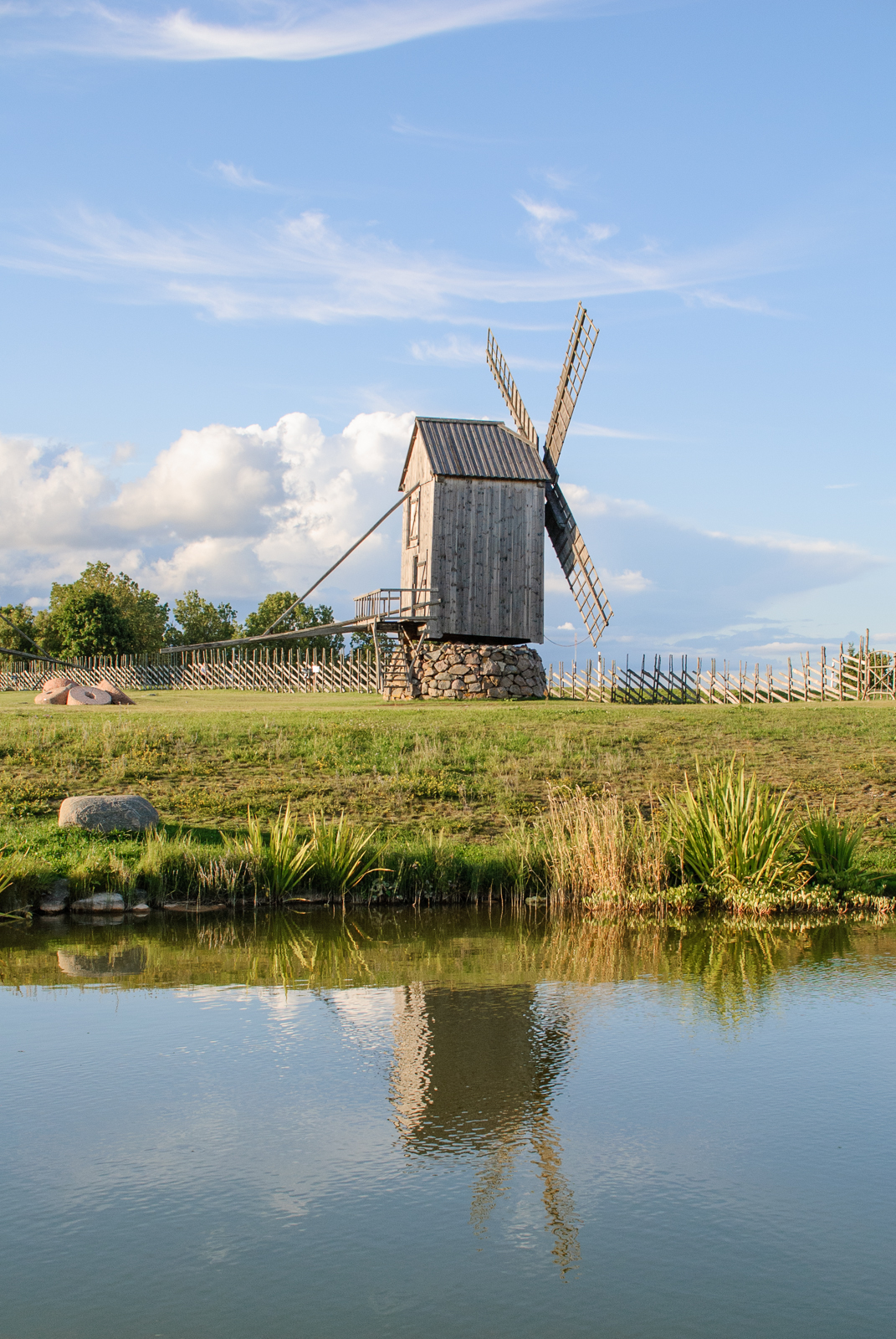
Windmill in Angla

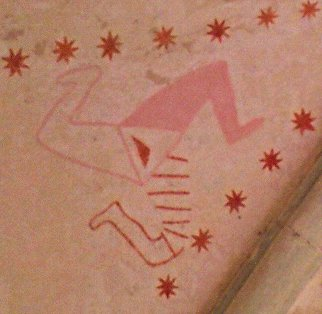
Historical mural in the church of Karja

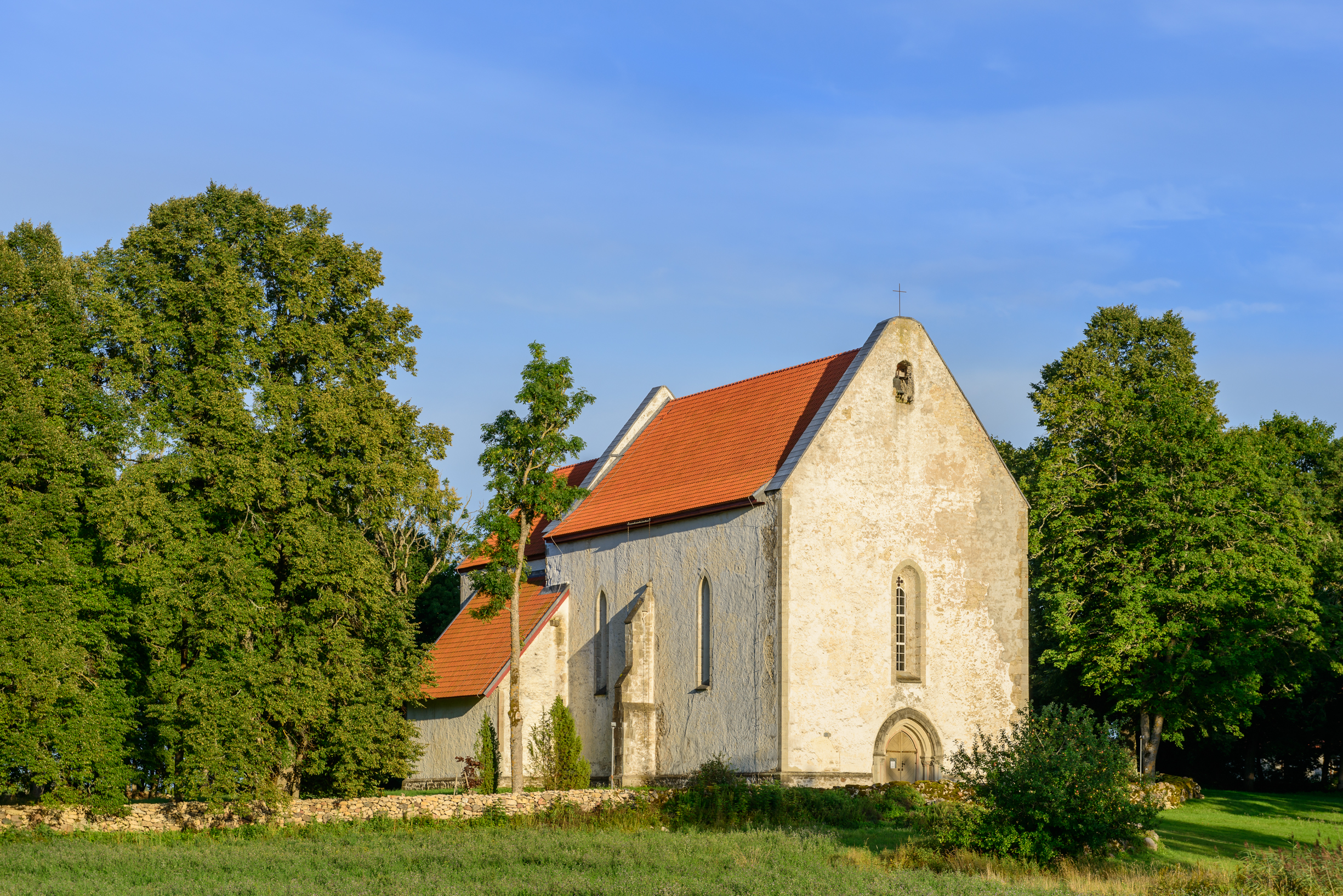
Karja Lutheran church

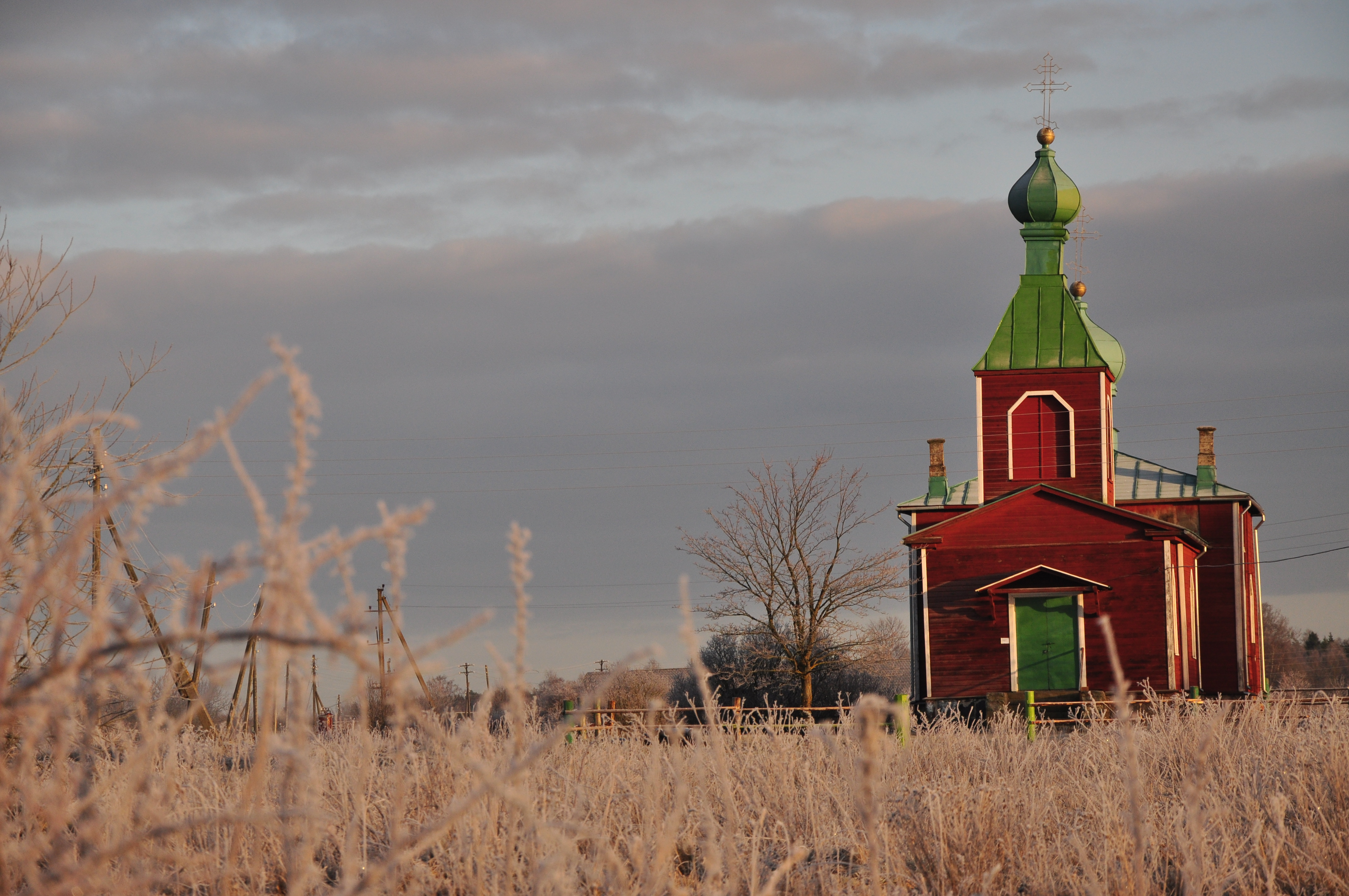
Metsküla orthodox church

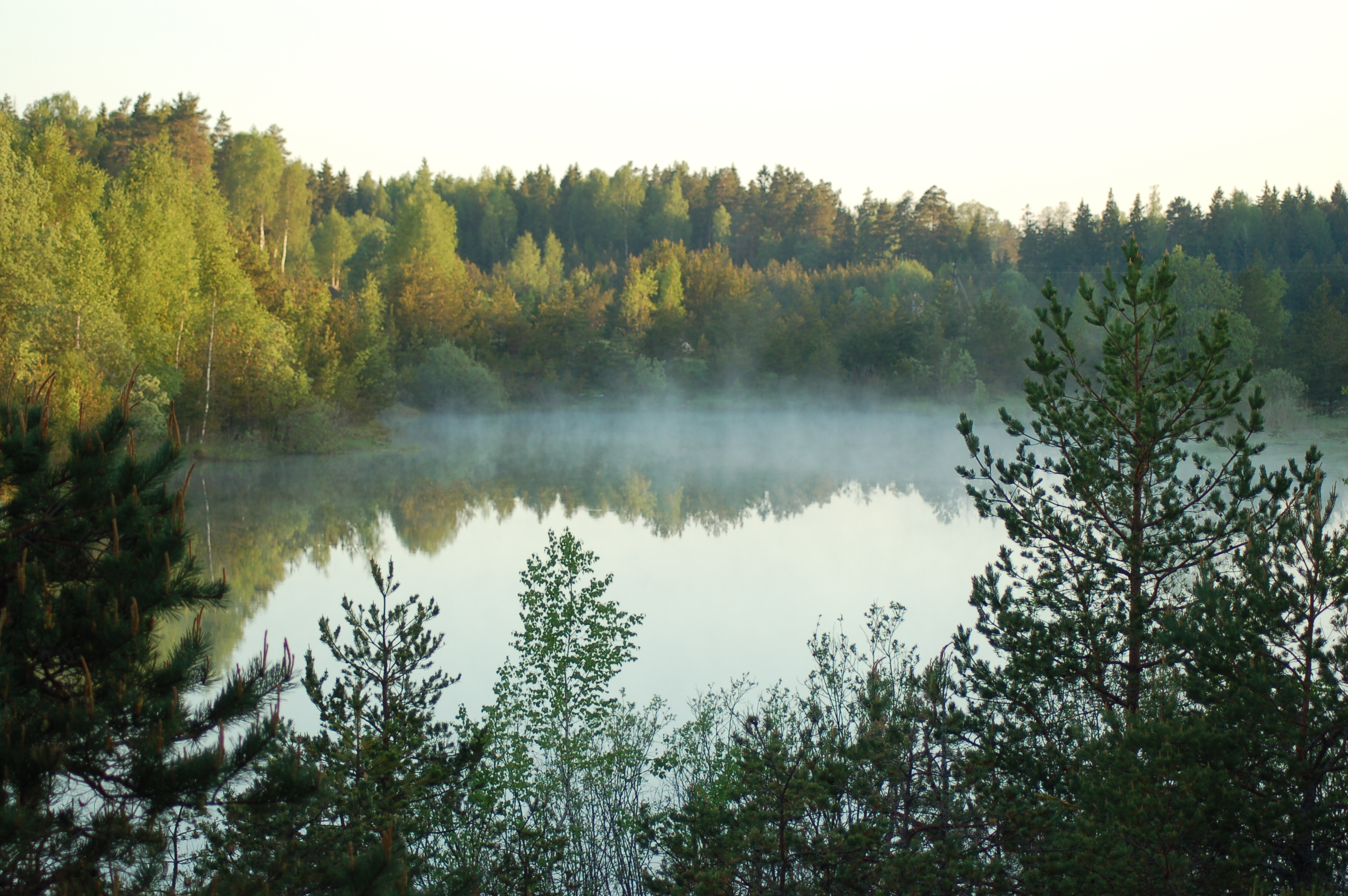
Tika quarry

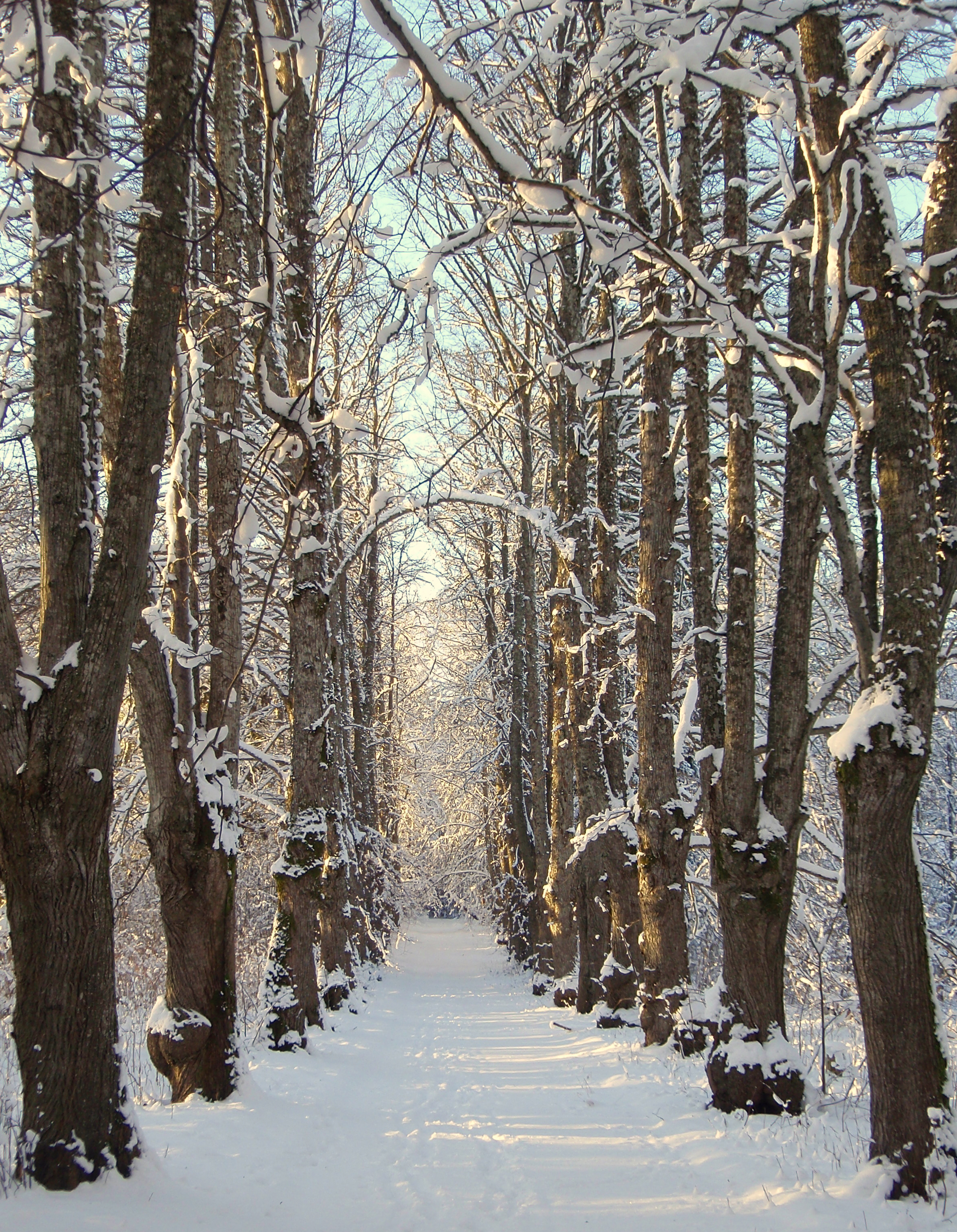
Triigi allée

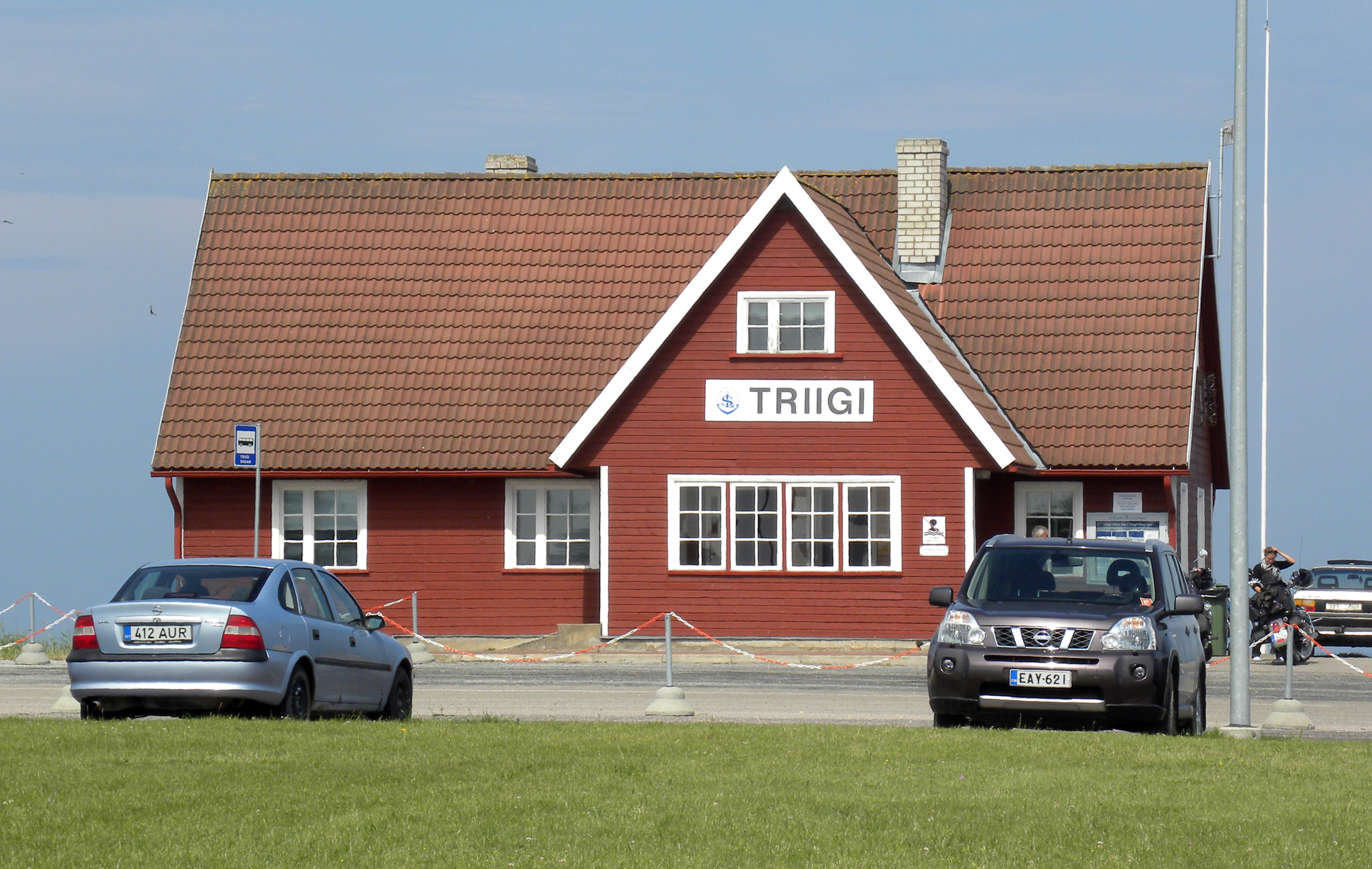
Triigi harbour building

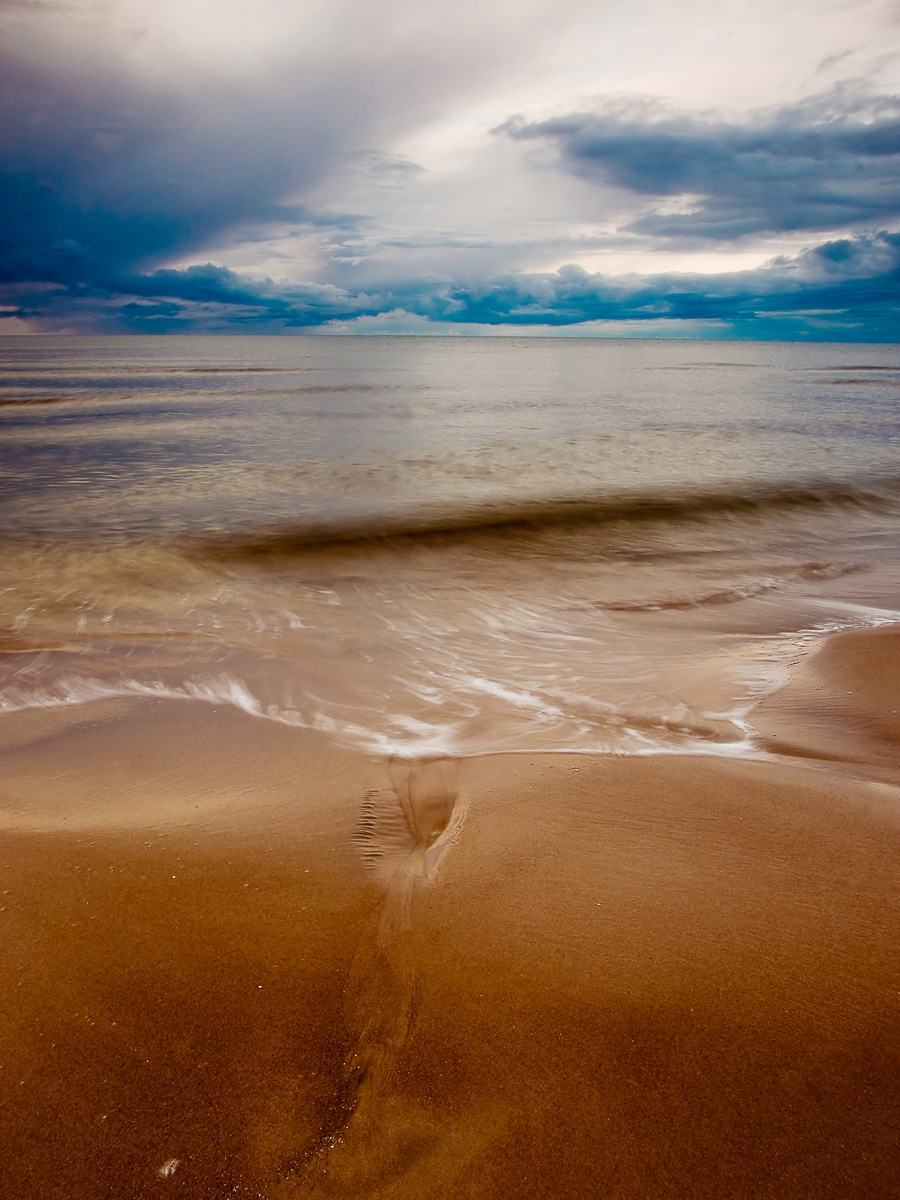
Tuhkana beach

== See also ==
- Municipalities of Estonia
