= Linnuse, Saaremaa Parish =

Village in Estonia

Coordinates: 58°29′33″N 22°32′31″E

Linnuse
- Village
- Interactive map of Linnuse
- Country: Estonia
- County: Saare County
- Parish: Saaremaa Parish
- Time zone: UTC+2 (EET)
  - Summer (DST): UTC+3 (EEST)

Linnuse is a village in Saaremaa Parish, Saare County in western Estonia.

Before the administrative reform in 2017, the village was in Leisi Parish.
