= Poka, Saare County =

Village in Estonia

Coordinates: 58°35′02″N 22°29′25″E

Poka
- Village
- Interactive map of Poka
- Country: Estonia
- County: Saare County
- Parish: Saaremaa Parish
- Time zone: UTC+2 (EET)
  - Summer (DST): UTC+3 (EEST)

Poka is a village located in Saaremaa Parish, Saare County in western Estonia. It is about 103 miles (166 km) south-west of Tallinn, the capital city of the country.

Before the administrative reform in 2017, the village was in Leisi Parish.
