= Mätja =

Village in Estonia

Coordinates: 58°31′N 22°46′E

- Village
- Interactive map of Mätja
- Country: Estonia
- County: Saare County
- Parish: Saaremaa Parish
- Time zone: UTC+2 (EET)
  - Summer (DST): UTC+3 (EEST)

Mätja is a village in Saaremaa Parish, Saare County in western Estonia.

Before administrative reform in 2017, the village was located in Leisi Parish.
