= Paramysis nouveli =

Scientific classification
- Kingdom: Animalia
- Phylum: Arthropoda
- Class: Malacostraca
- Order: Mysida
- Family: Mysidae
- Genus: Paramysis
- Species: P. nouveli

Binomial name
- Paramysis nouveli Labat, 1953

Species of crustacean

Paramysis nouveli is a species of mysid crustacean, found in marine shallow-water habitats in Western Europe.
