= Tutku, Estonia =

Village in Estonia

Tutku
- Village
- Location within Estonia
- Coordinates: 58°29′39″N 22°42′30″E
- Country: Estonia
- County: Saare County
- Parish: Saaremaa Parish
- Time zone: UTC+2 (EET)
  - Summer (DST): UTC+3 (EEST)
- Area code: 372

Tutku is a village in Saaremaa Parish, Saare County in western Estonia.

Before the administrative reform in 2017, the village was in Leisi Parish.
