= Paramysis intermedia =

Scientific classification
- Kingdom: Animalia
- Phylum: Arthropoda
- Class: Malacostraca
- Order: Mysida
- Family: Mysidae
- Genus: Paramysis
- Species: P. intermedia

Binomial name
- Paramysis intermedia (Czerniavsky, 1882)

Synonyms
- Mesomysis intermedia Czerniavsky, 1882

Species of crustacean

Paramysis intermedia is a species of shrimp in the family Mysidae. Its natural distribution is Ponto-Caspian, but it is also invasive species, e.g. on the Baltic coast of Estonia. It tolerates salinities between 0–12 ppt; it occurs in estuaries but does not penetrate very deep into rivers.

Paramysis intermedia measures 6–13 mm (0.2–0.5 in) in length.
