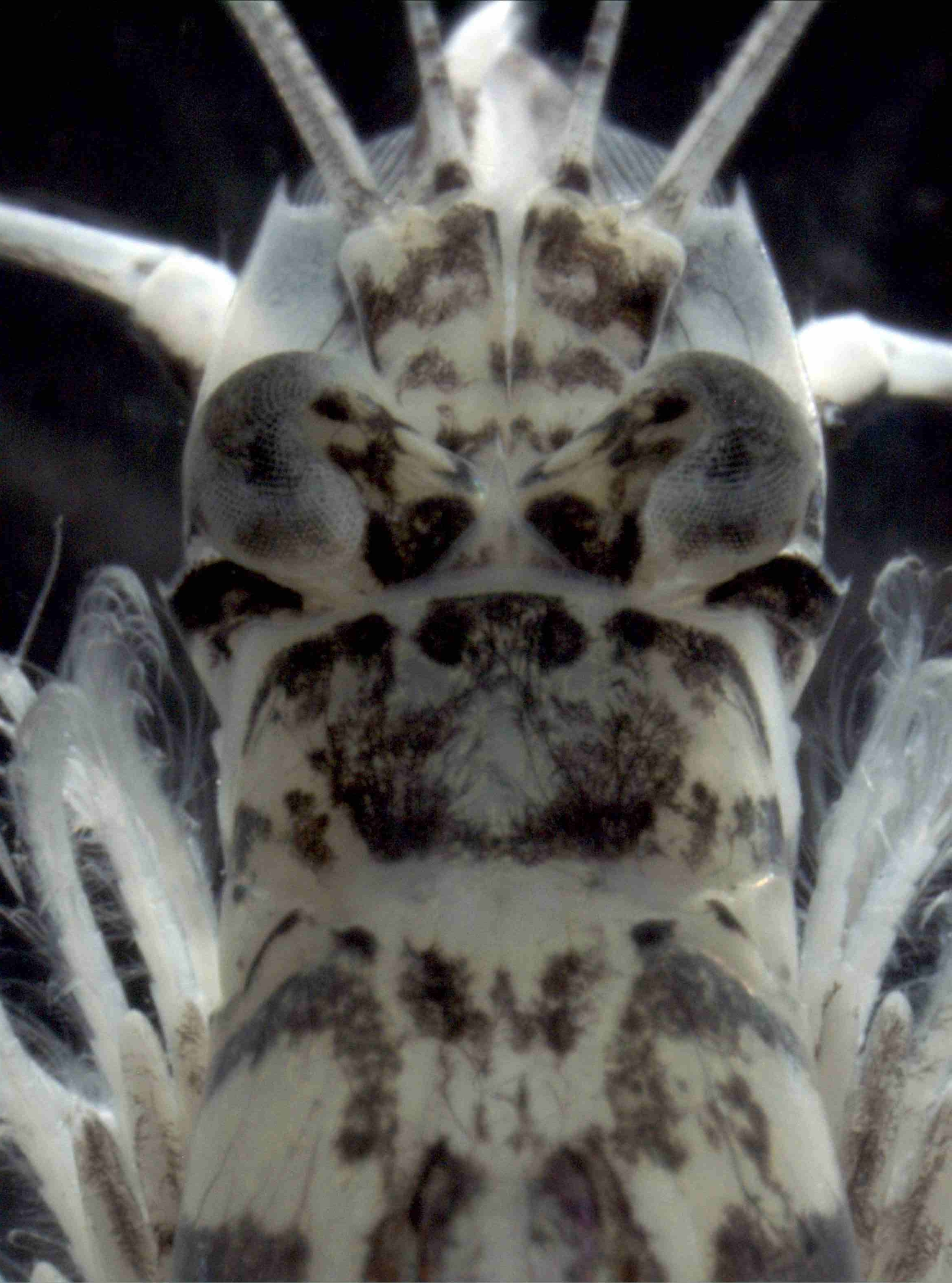
- Head of Paramysis ullskyi

Scientific classification
- Domain: Eukaryota
- Kingdom: Animalia
- Phylum: Arthropoda
- Class: Malacostraca
- Order: Mysida
- Family: Mysidae
- Subfamily: Mysinae
- Tribe: Paramysini
- Genus: Paramysis; Czerniavsky, 1882

= Paramysis =

Genus of crustaceans

Paramysis (from the Greek affix para-, "near", "beside", and the genus name Mysis) is a genus of mysid crustaceans (Mysidacea) in family Mysidae, distributed in coastal zone of low boreal East Atlantic Ocean, Mediterranean Sea and the basins of Black Sea, Sea of Azov and Caspian Sea (Ponto-Caspian Basin).

== Biogeography ==
The majority of Paramysis species are brackish- or freshwater endemics of the Ponto-Caspian Basin; some of them naturally spread more than 500 kilometres (310 mi) up large rivers, including the Volga, Don, Dnieper and Danube. A number of Ponto-Caspian species have been introduced outside the native range. Marine species from the Atlantic Ocean and Mediterranean Sea have probably descended from ancient Ponto-Caspian populations.

== Diversity ==
There are 24 species classified into 7 subgenera. Body length ranges from 1 to 4 centimetres (0.4 to 1.6 in). The largest species, like P. eurylepis, P. inflata, are found only in the Caspian Sea. Generic characters: subrostral plate; large eyes on short stalk; antennal scale with smooth outer margin, ended by strong spine, and distal segment rudimentary with five setae; four segments of pereiopod 1–4 carpopropodus; five segments in pleopod 4 of male. Consumed by fishes; particularly important for juvenile sturgeons and zander.

Two extinct species, previously included into this genus, have been recently moved into extinct genus Sarmysis.

== Species ==
Subgenus Paramysis sensu stricto

- Paramysis baeri Czerniavsky, 1882
- Paramysis bakuensis G. O. Sars, 1895
- Paramysis eurylepis G. O. Sars, 1907
- Paramysis kessleri (Grimm in G. O. Sars, 1895)

Subgenus Metamysis G. O. Sars, 1893

- Paramysis grimmi (G. O. Sars, 1895)
- Paramysis inflata (G. O. Sars, 1907)
- Paramysis ullskyi Czerniavsky, 1882

Subgenus Serrapalpisis Daneliya, 2004

- Paramysis incerta G. O. Sars, 1895
- Paramysis kosswigi Băcescu, 1948
- Paramysis lacustris (Czerniavsky, 1882)
- Paramysis sowinskii Daneliya, 2002

Subgenus Mesomysis Czerniavsky, 1882

- Paramysis intermedia (Czerniavsky, 1882)

Subgenus Nanoparamysis Daneliya, 2004

- Paramysis loxolepis (G. O. Sars, 1895)

Subgenus Longidentia Daneliya, 2004

- Paramysis adriatica Wittmann, Ariani et Daneliya, 2016
- Paramysis helleri (G. O. Sars, 1877)
- Paramysis kroyeri (Czerniavsky, 1882)
- Paramysis nouveli Labat, 1953
- Paramysis agigensis Băcescu, 1940

Subgenus Pseudoparamysis Băcescu, 1940

- Paramysis bacescoi Labat, 1953
- Paramysis pontica (Băcescu, 1940)

Incertae sedis

- Paramysis festae Colosi, 1922
- Paramysis portzicensis Nouvel, 1950
- Paramysis proconnesia Colosi, 1922
- Paramysis arenosa (G. O. Sars, 1877)
