= Muraste Nature Reserve =

Protected area in Estonia

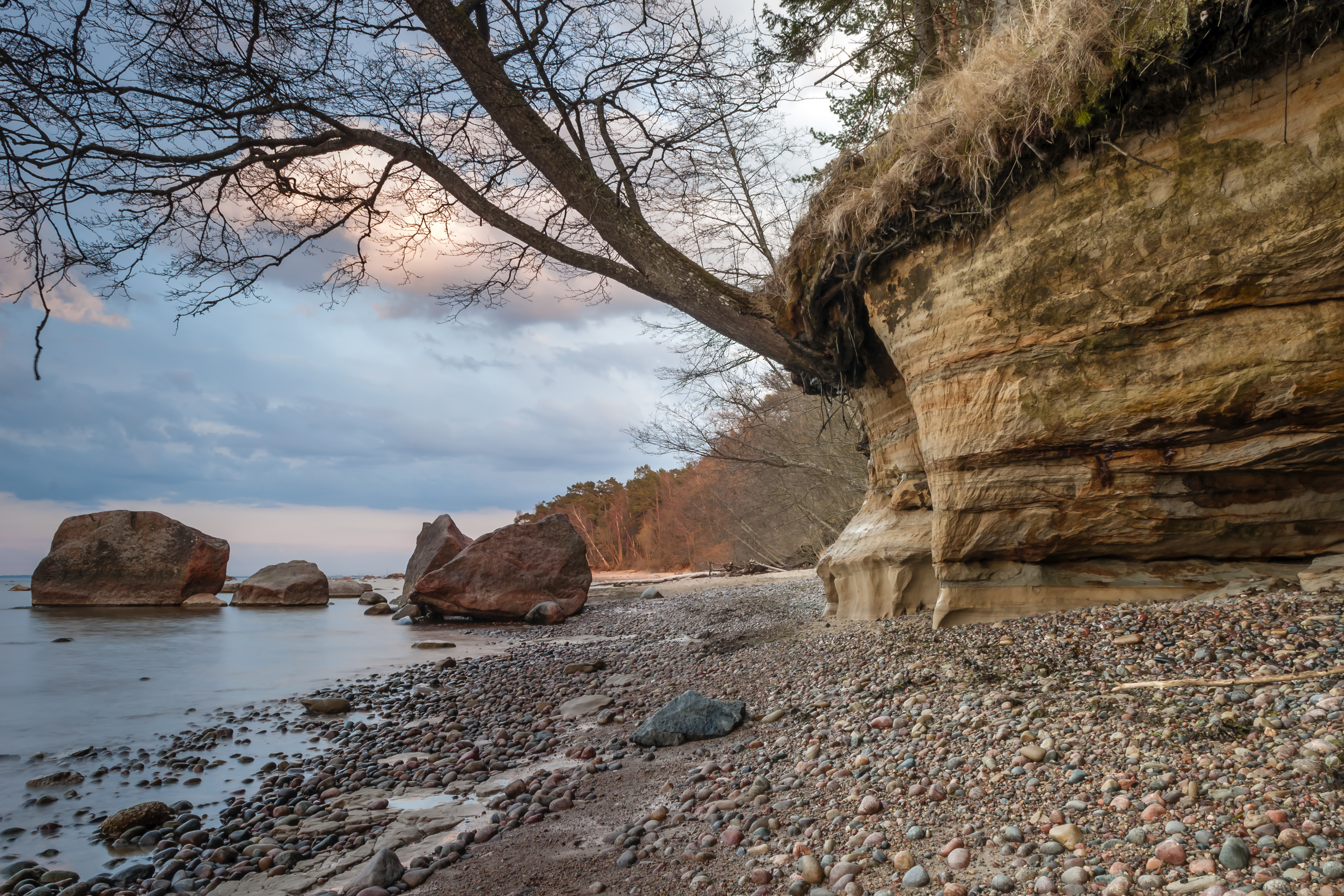

- Location within Estonia
- Location: Estonia
- Nearest city: Muraste
- Coordinates: 59°28′03″N 24°26′45″E
- Area: 141 ha (350 acres)
- Established: 2005

Muraste Nature Reserve is a nature reserve which is located in Harju County, Estonia.

The area of the nature reserve is 141 ha.

The protected area was founded in 2005 to protect valuable habitat types and threatened species in Muraste and Suurupi village (both in Harku Parish).
