= Sarve Landscape Conservation Area =

Protected area in Estonia

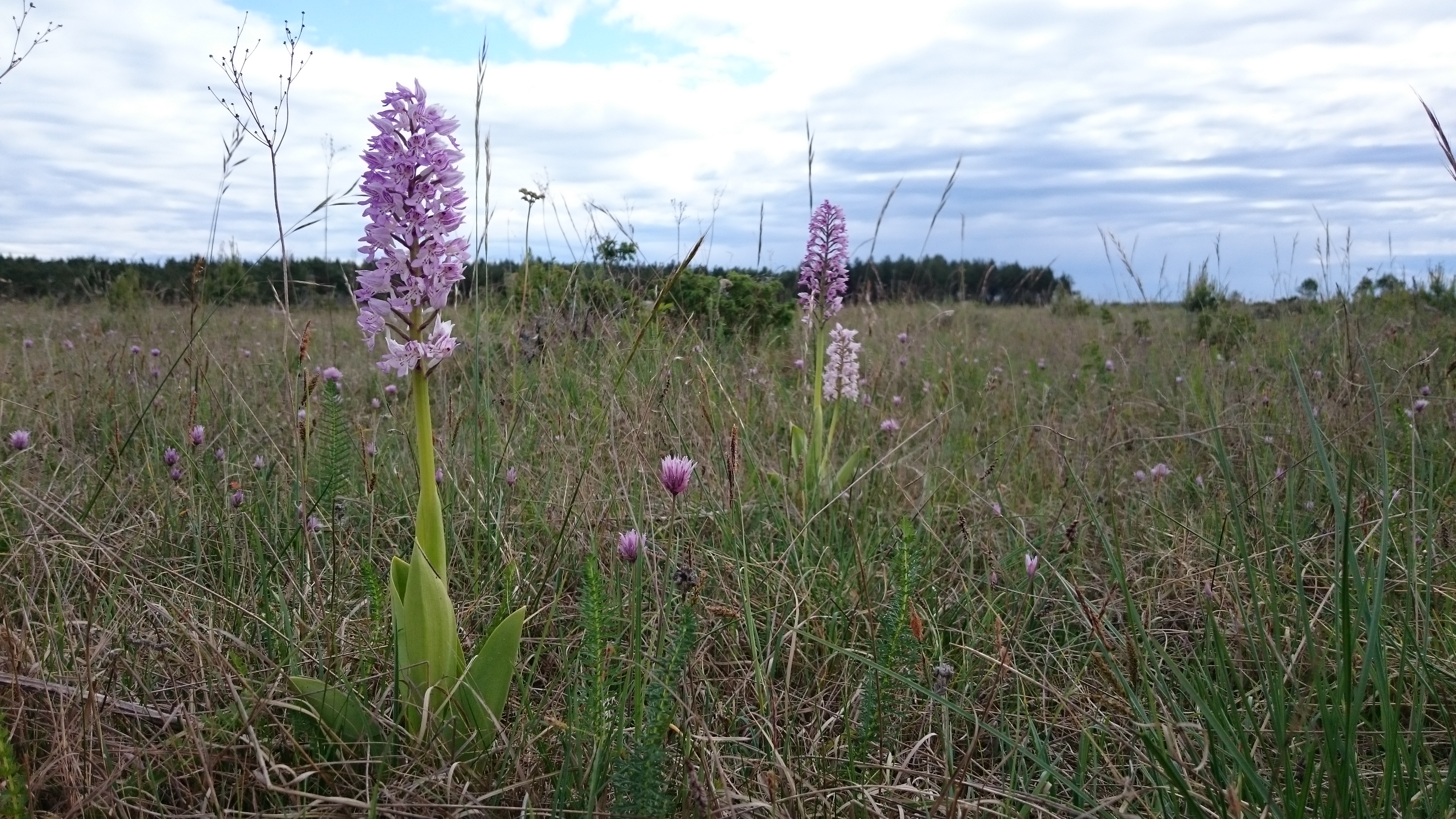

- Location within Estonia
- Location: Estonia
- Coordinates: 58°51′N 23°03′E
- Area: 810 ha (2,000 acres)
- Established: 1973 (1996)

Sarve Landscape Conservation Area (Estonian: Sarve maastikukaitseala) is a nature park which is located in Hiiu County, Estonia.

The area of the nature park is 810 ha.

The protected area was founded in 1973 to protect landscapes and biodiversity of Sarve Peninsula. In 1996, the protected area was designated to the landscape conservation area.
