= Pärnu Grasslands Nature Reserve =

Protected area in Estonia

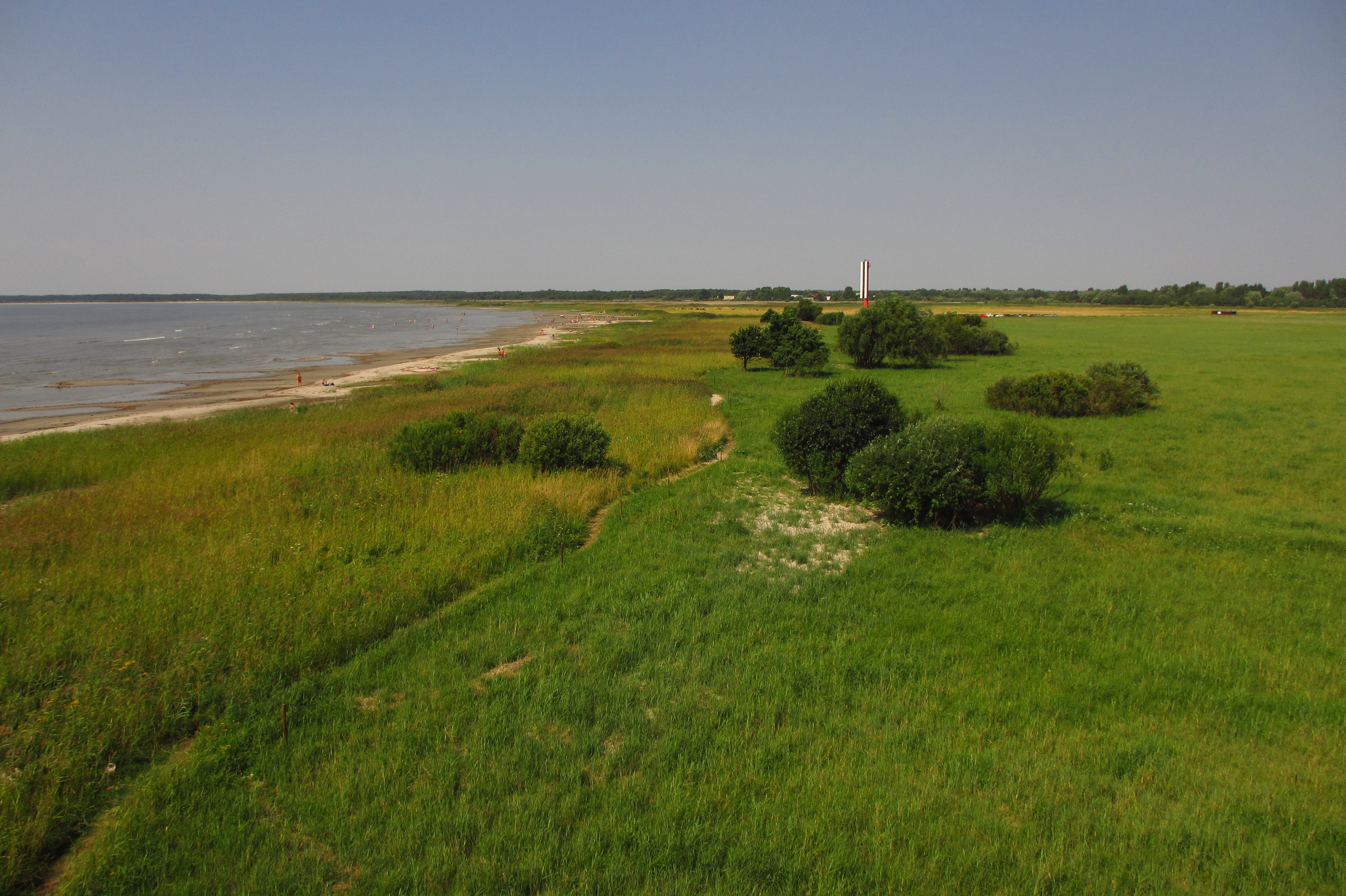
- Interactive map of Pärnu Grasslands Nature Reserve
- Location: Estonia
- Coordinates: 58.364°N 24.534°E
- Area: 397 ha (980 acres)
- Established: 1958 (2007)

Drone video of Pärnu coastal meadow hiking trail, beach and town in June 2022

Pärnu Grasslands Nature Reserve is a nature reserve which is located in Pärnu County, Estonia.

The area of the nature reserve is 397 ha.

The protected area was founded in 1958 on the basis of Pärnu coastal reeds (Estonian: Pärnu rannaroostik). In 2007 the protected area was designated to the nature reserve.
