= Kanahaud Landscape Conservation Area =

Protected area in Estonia

- Location within Estonia
- Location: Estonia
- Coordinates: 58°15′00″N 26°24′30″E
- Area: 5 ha (12 acres)
- Established: 1964 (2015)

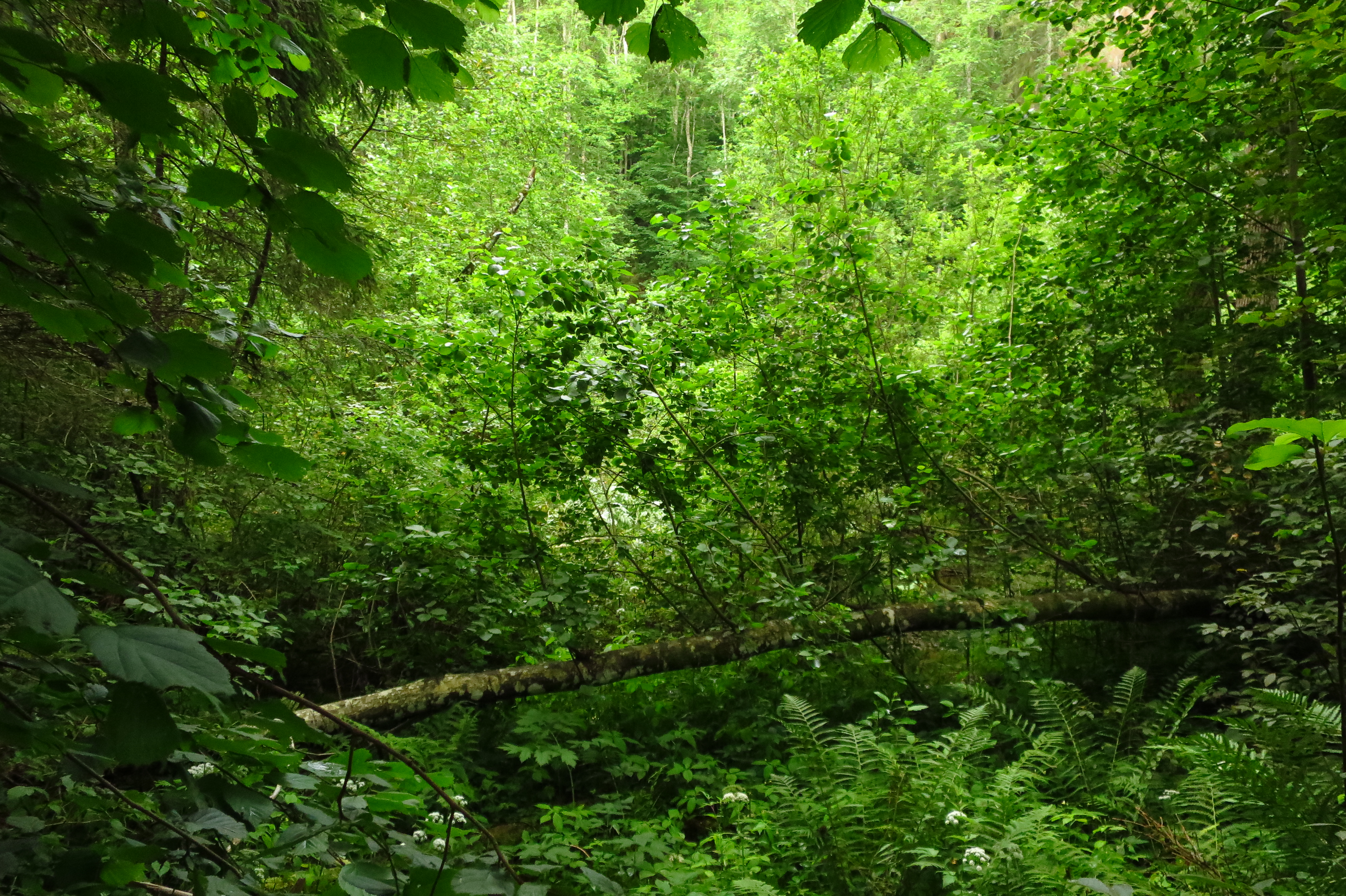
Kanahaud Landscape Conservation Area

Kanahaud Landscape Conservation Area (Estonian: Kanahaua maastikukaitseala) is a nature park in Tartu County, Estonia.

Its area is 5 ha.

The protected area was designated in 1964 to protect Kanahaua Hollow (Estonian: Kanahaua sulglohk) (:et) and its surrounding areas. In 2015, the protected area was redesigned to the landscape conservation area.
