= Tudusoo Nature Reserve =

Protected area in Estonia

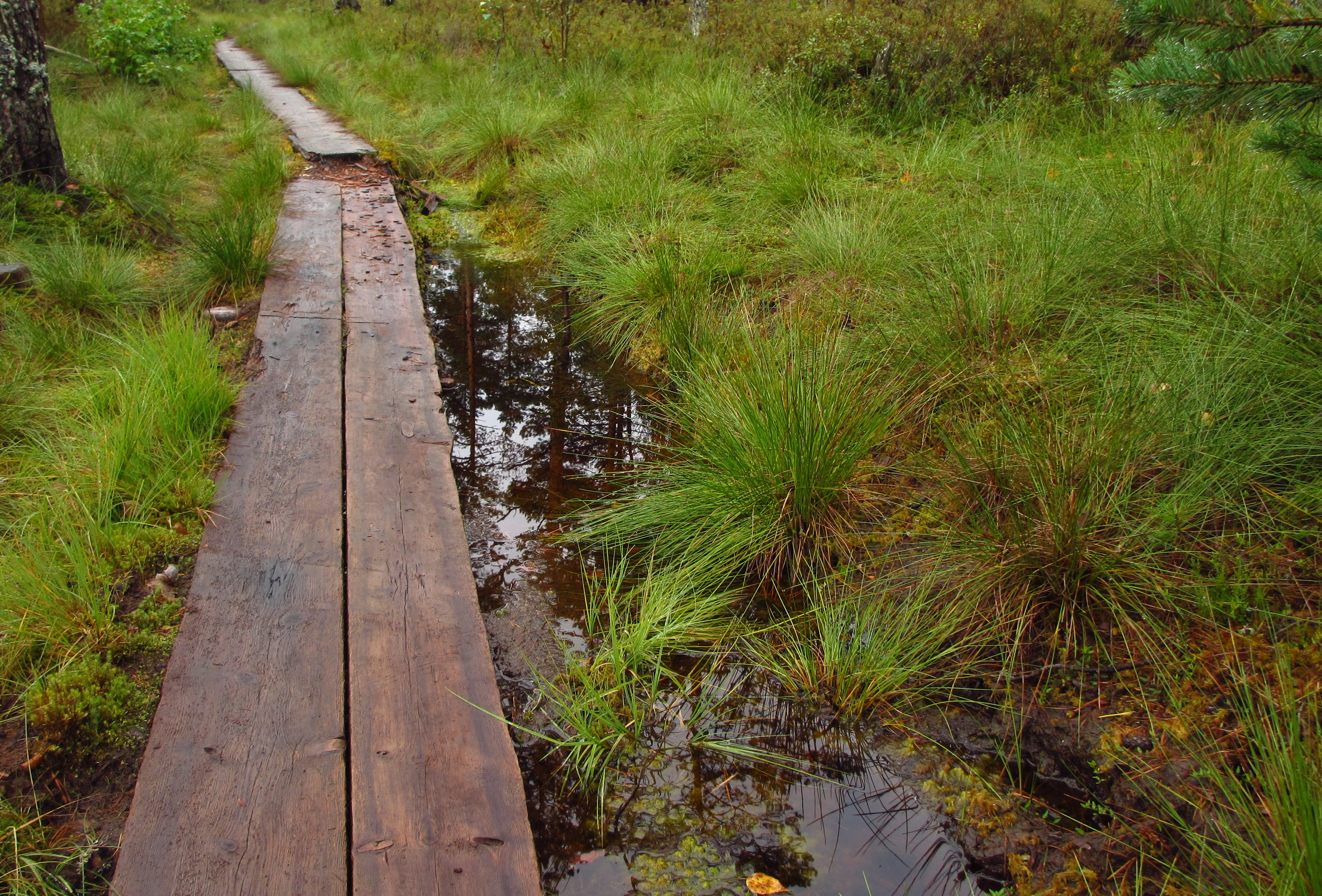

- Location within Estonia
- Location: Estonia
- Coordinates: 59°09′N 26°46′E
- Area: 4,749 ha (11,740 acres)
- Established: 1978 (2006)

Tudusoo Nature Reserve is a nature reserve which is located in Lääne-Viru County, Estonia.

The area of the nature reserve is 4749 ha.

The protected area was founded between 1976 and 1981 when several areas (included Tudu Järvesoo Bog) were taken under protection. In 1997 the protected area was designated to the Tudusoo Landscape Conservation Area. In 2006 the protected area was designated to the Tudusoo Nature Reserve.
