= Luhasoo Nature Reserve =

Protected area in Estonia

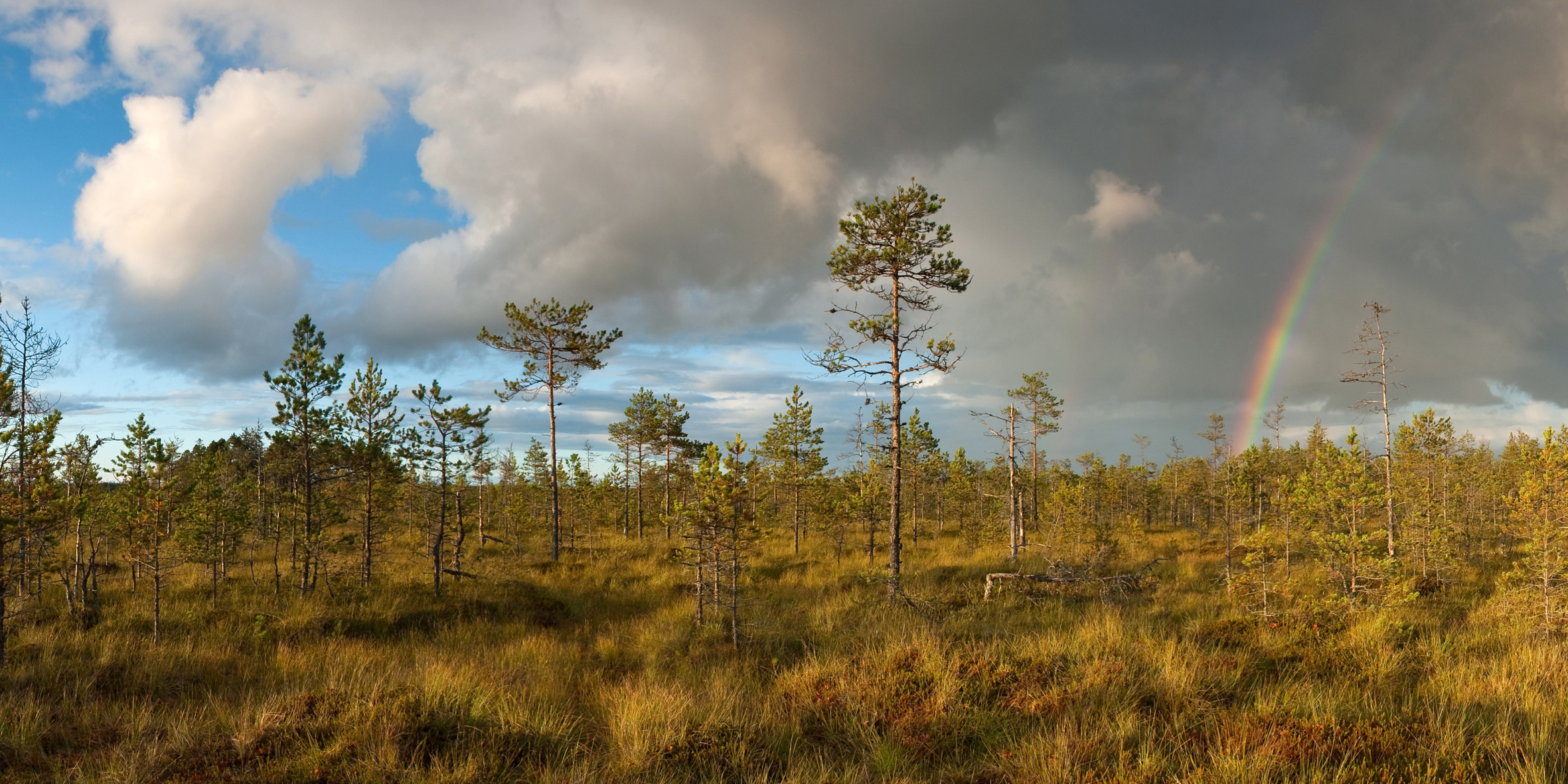

- Location within Estonia
- Location: Estonia
- Coordinates: 57°39′N 26°54′E
- Area: 711 ha (1,760 acres)
- Established: 1981 (2017)

Luhasoo Nature Reserve is a nature reserve which is located in Võru County, Estonia.

The area of the nature reserve is 711 ha.

The protected area was founded in 1981 on the basis of Luhasoo Wetland Conservation Area. Before 2000, the area was designated as Luhasoo Landscape Conservation Area .
