= Kääpa Landscape Conservation Area =

Protected area in Estonia

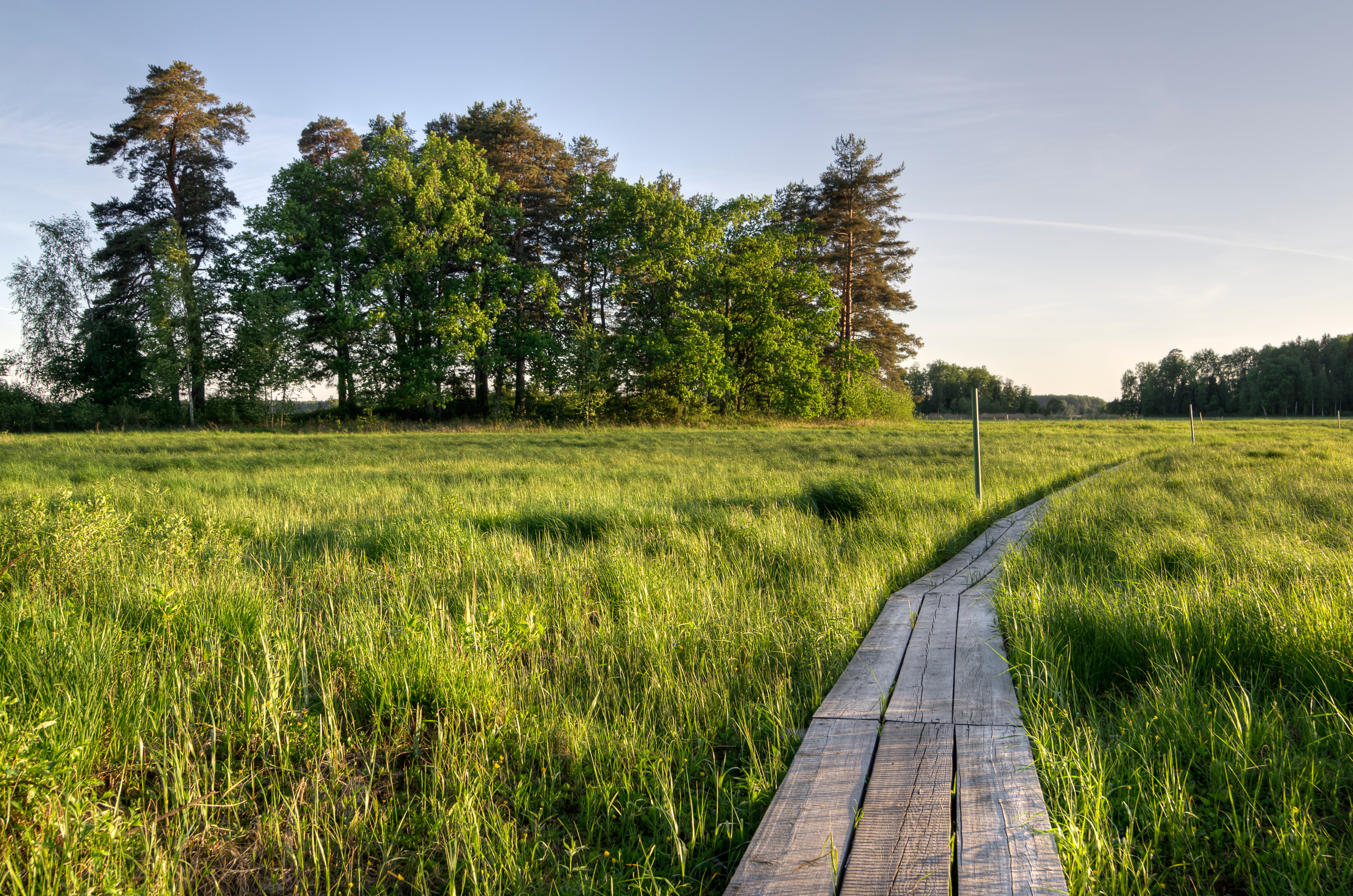

- Location within Estonia
- Location: Estonia
- Coordinates: 58°38′N 26°50′E
- Area: 2,296 ha (5,670 acres)
- Established: 1968 (2010)

Kääpa Landscape Conservation Area is a nature park situated in Tartu County, Estonia.

Its area is 2296 ha.

The protected area was designated in 1968 after reorganizing Tammeluha Protected Area. In 2005, the protected area was redesigned to the landscape conservation area.
