= Sämi Landscape Conservation Area =

Protected area in Estonia

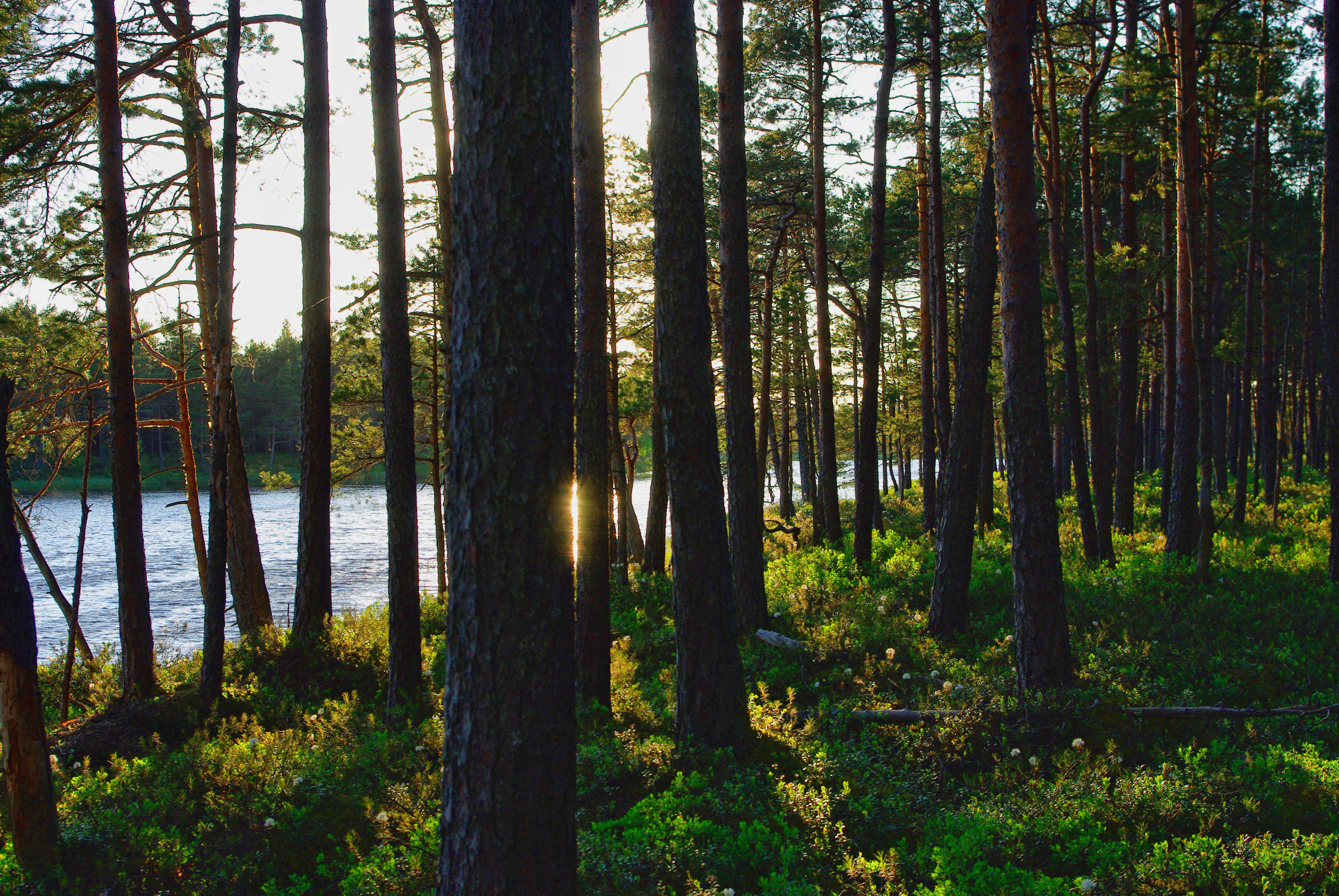

- Location within Estonia
- Location: Estonia
- Coordinates: 59°23′N 26°40′E
- Area: 946 ha (2,340 acres)
- Established: 1981 (2005)

Sämi Landscape Conservation Area is a nature park which is located in Lääne-Viru County, Estonia.

The area of the nature park is 946 ha.

The protected area was founded in 1981 to protect Sämi-Kuristiku Wetland Protection Area (Estonian: Sämi-Kuristiku sookaitseala). In 2005, the protected area was designated to the landscape conservation area.
