= Marimetsa Nature Reserve =

Protected area in Estonia

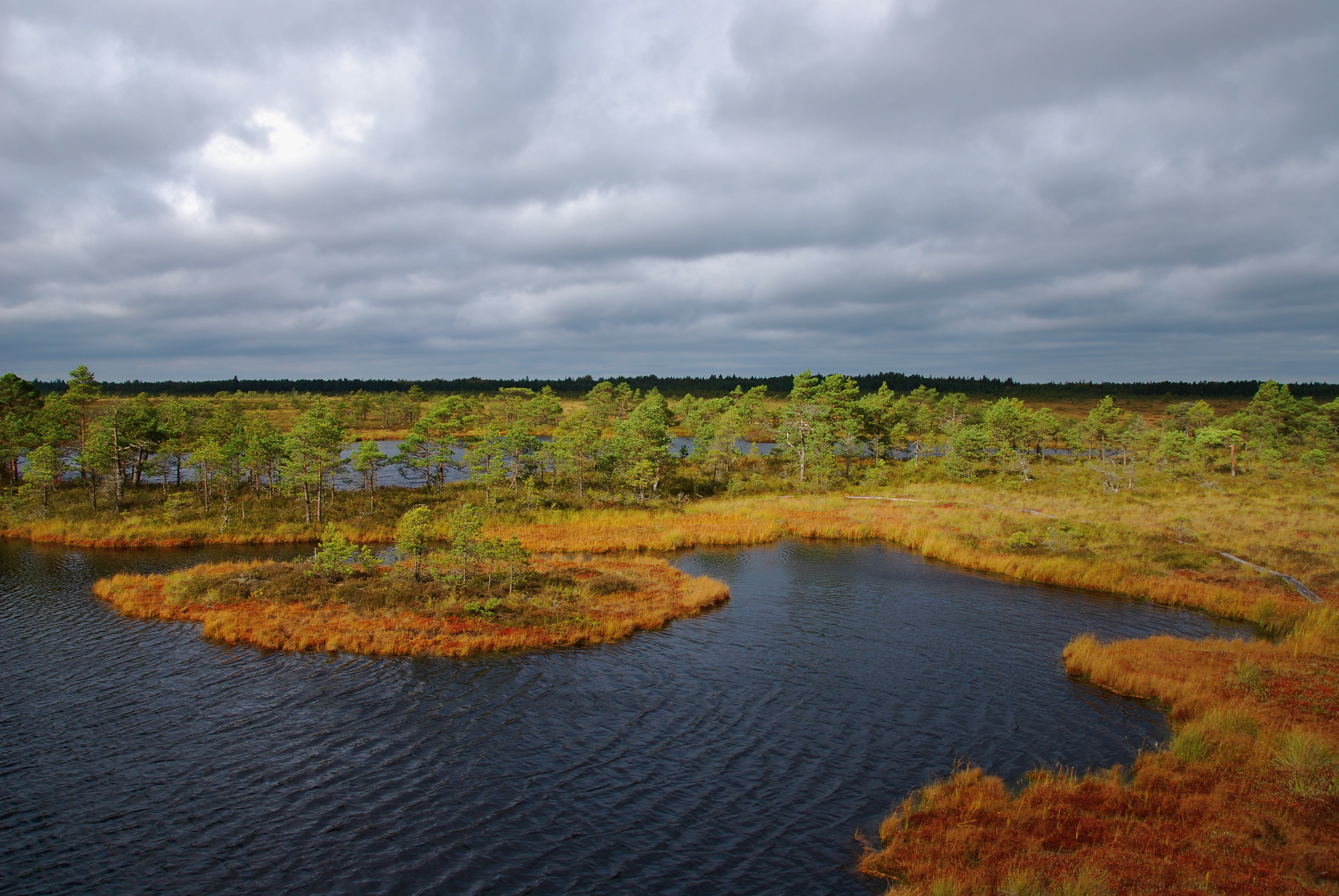

- Location within Estonia
- Location: Estonia
- Coordinates: 58°56′N 24°00′E
- Area: 5,083 ha (12,560 acres)
- Established: 1964 (2006)

Marimetsa Nature Reserve is a nature reserve which is located in Lääne County, Estonia.

The area of the nature reserve is 5083 ha.

The protected area was founded 1964 on the basis of Kullamaa Liivamäed hills and Marimetsa Wetland Conservation Area. In 2005 the protected area was designated to the nature reserve.
