= Rabivere Landscape Conservation Area =

Protected area in Estonia

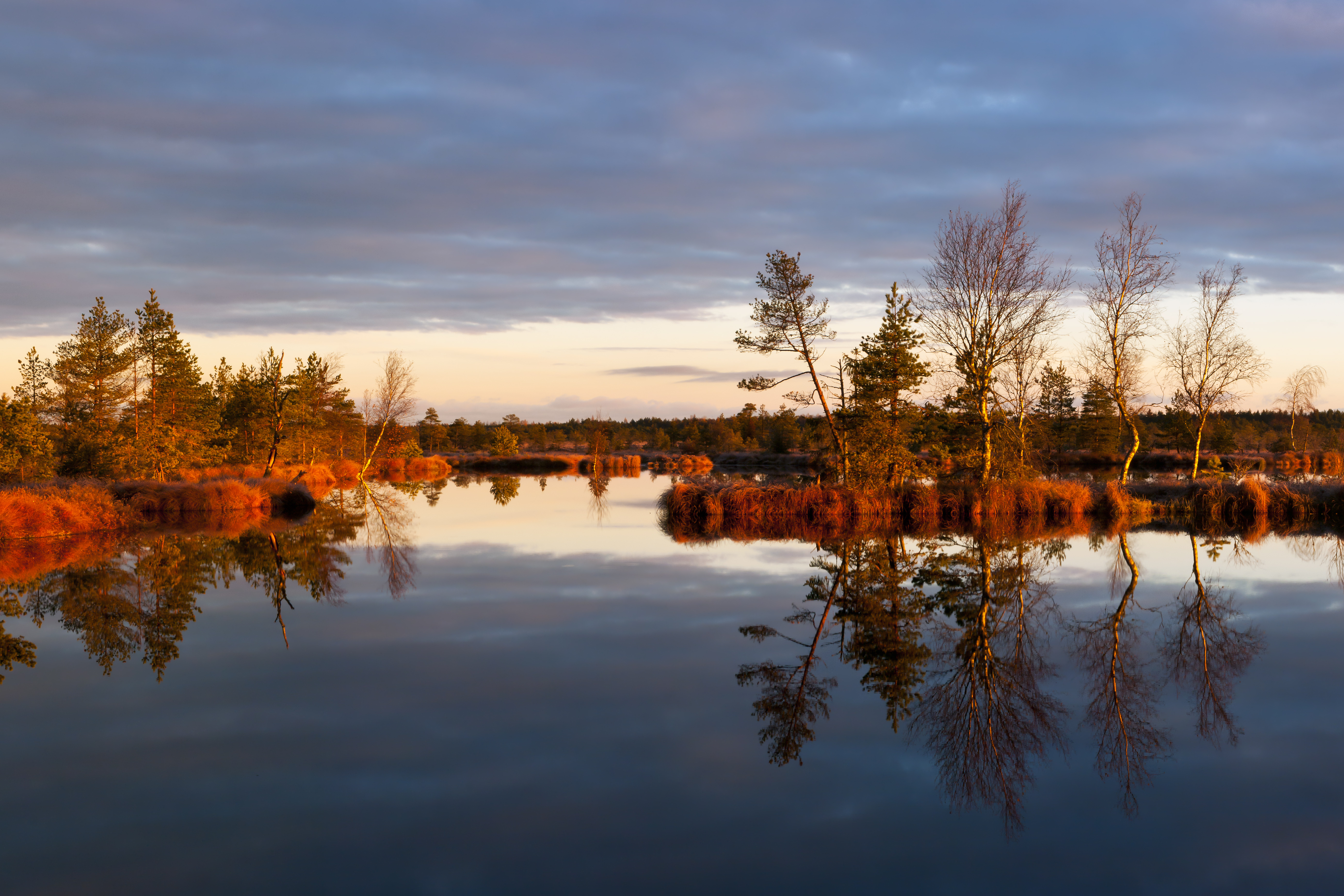

- Location within Estonia
- Location: Estonia
- Coordinates: 59°07′N 24°45′E
- Area: 2,169 ha (5,360 acres)
- Established: 1981 (2005)

Rabivere Landscape Conservation Area is a nature park which is located in Rapla County, Estonia.

The area of the nature park is 2169 ha.

The protected area was founded in 1981 to protect Rabivere Bog. In 2005, the protected area was designated to the landscape conservation area.
