= Raikküla-Pakamäe Landscape Conservation Area =

Protected area in Estonia

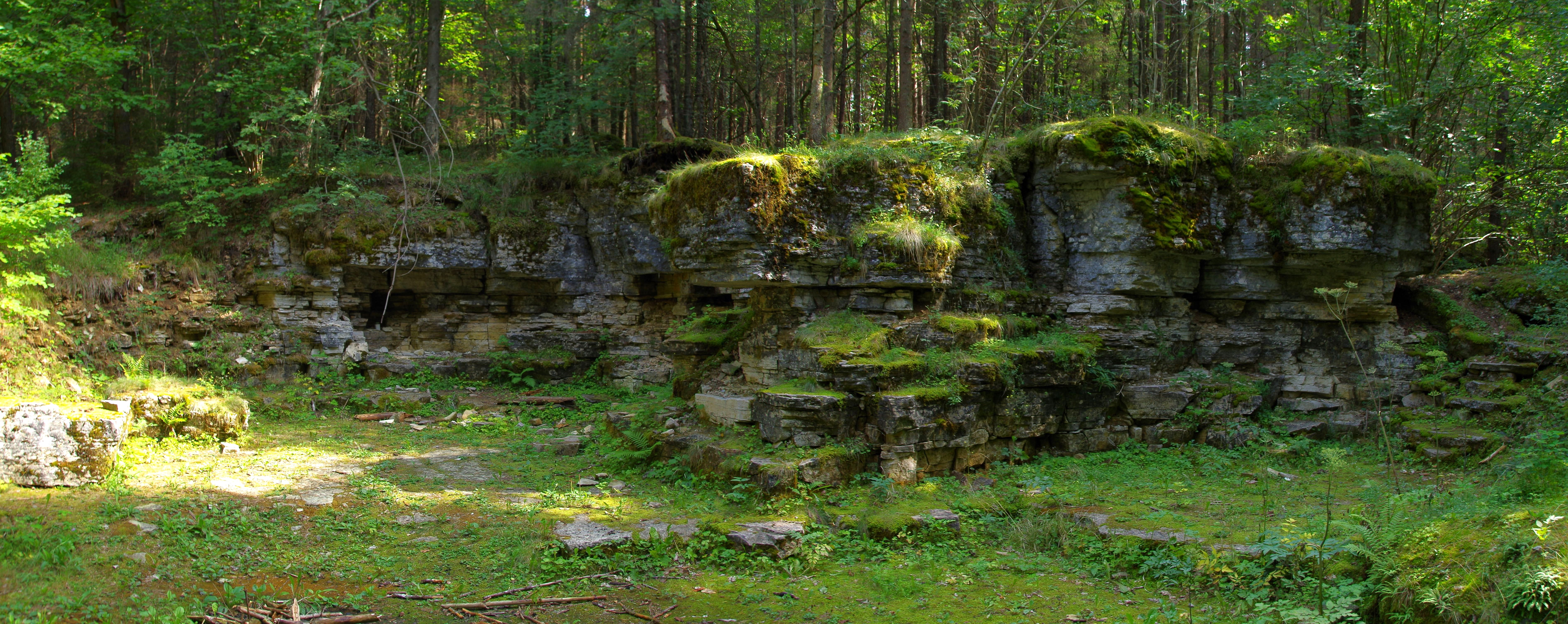

- Location within Estonia
- Location: Estonia
- Coordinates: 58°56′30″N 24°44′50″E
- Area: 20 ha (49 acres)
- Established: 1973 (2006)

Raikküla-Pakamäe Landscape Conservation Area (Estonian: Raikküla-Pakamäe maastikukaitseala) is a nature park which is located in Rapla County, Estonia.

The area of the nature park is 57.7 hectares. This includes 50.6 hectares of private land and 7.1 hectares of municipal land within the designated boundaries.

The protected area was founded in 1973 to protect Paka and Raikküla coastal formations (Estonian: rannamoodustised). In 2006, the protected area was designated to the landscape conservation area.

On March 4, 2022, by Government regulation no.21, the Raikküla-Pakamäe Landscape Conservation Area was incorporated into the newly established Raikküla-Paka Landscape Conservation Area which combined several protected habitats into a single protected area.
