= Rutu Landscape Conservation Area =

Protected area in Estonia

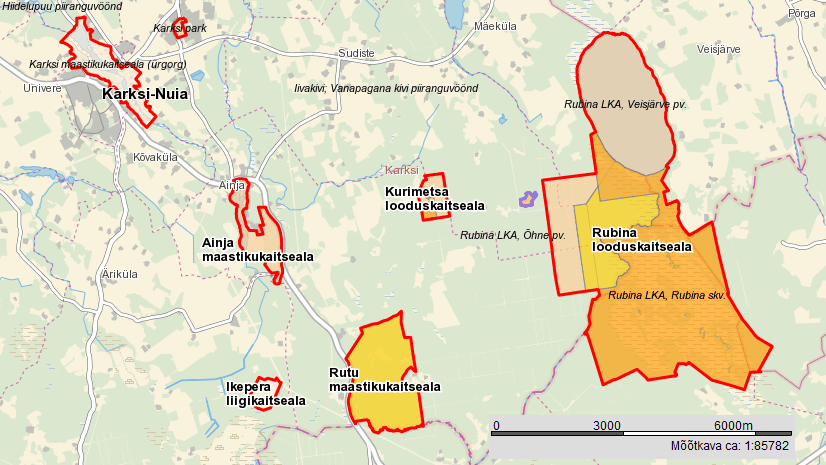

- Location within Estonia
- Location: Estonia
- Coordinates: 58°02′30″N 25°39′30″E
- Area: 329 ha (810 acres)
- Established: 1990 (2017)

Rutu Landscape Conservation Area is a nature park which is located in Viljandi County, Estonia.

The area of the nature park is 329 ha.

The protected area was founded in 1990 to protect Rutu Hill (:et) and its surrounding areas. In 2001, the protected area was designated to the landscape conservation area.
