= Uhtju Nature Reserve =

Protected area in Estonia

- Location within Estonia
- Location: Estonia
- Coordinates: 59°40′40″N 26°30′40″E
- Area: 2,956 ha (7,300 acres)
- Established: 1938 (2018)

Uhtju Nature Reserve is a nature reserve, which is located in Lääne-Viru County, Estonia.

The area of the nature reserve is 2956 ha.

The protected area was founded in 1938 to protect Lõuna-Uhtju Islet, and in 1958, the Põhja-Uhtju Islet (or Uhtju Islet) was taken under protection. In 2001, the protected areas was designated to the nature reserve.
