= Koorunõmme Nature Reserve =

Protected area in Estonia

- Interactive map of Koorunõmme Nature Reserve
- Location: Estonia
- Coordinates: 58.5°N 22.2°E
- Area: 1,272 ha (3,140 acres)
- Established: 1965 (2004)

Koorunõmme Nature Reserve is a nature reserve which is located in Saare County, Estonia.

The area of the nature reserve is 1272 ha.

History of the protected area dates back to the year 1965 when Maapere stone grove conservation area (Estonian: Maapere rauna kaitseala) was established. In 2004 the protected area was designated to the nature reserve.
