= Kiigumõisa Landscape Conservation Area =

Protected area in Estonia

- Location within Estonia
- Location: Estonia
- Coordinates: 59°03′30″N 25°40′00″E
- Area: 170 ha (420 acres)
- Established: 1981 (2005)

Kiigumõisa Landscape Conservation Area is a nature park situated in Järva County, Estonia.

Its area is 170 ha.

The protected area was designated in 1981 to protect Kiigumõisa Springs and Määrasmäe springlike (Estonian: Määrasmäe allikajärv). In 2005, the protected area was redesigned to the landscape conservation area.
