= Lavassaare Nature Reserve =

Protected area in Estonia

- Location within Estonia
- Location: Estonia
- Coordinates: 58°33′N 24°18′E
- Area: 11,132 ha (27,510 acres)
- Established: 1957 (2016)

Lavassaare Nature Reserve is a nature reserve which is located in Pärnu County, Estonia.

The area of the nature reserve is 11,132 ha.

The protected area was founded in 1957 on the basis of Virussaare Wetland Conservation Area (Estonian: Virussaare rabasaare kaitseala). In 2017 the protected area was designated to the nature reserve.
