= Kesselaid Landscape Conservation Area =

Protected area in Estonia

- Location within Estonia
- Location: Estonia
- Coordinates: 58°38′N 23°26′E
- Area: 175 ha (430 acres)
- Established: 1938 (2017)

Kesselaid Landscape Conservation Area (Estonian: Kesselaiu maastikukaitseala) is a nature park in Saare County, Estonia.

Its area is 175 ha.

The protected area was designated in 1938 to protect Kesselaiu Cliff and its surrounding areas. In 2004, the protected area was redesignated to the landscape conservation area.
