= Pärnu Landscape Conservation Area =

Protected area in Estonia

- Location within Estonia
- Location: Estonia
- Coordinates: 58°20′N 24°36′E
- Area: 511 ha (1,260 acres)
- Established: 1958 (2007)

Pärnu Landscape Conservation Area is a nature park which is located in Pärnu County, Estonia.

The area of the nature park is 511 ha.

The protected area was founded in 1958 to protect Raeküla Pine Forest and its surrounding areas. In 2007, the protected area was designated to the landscape conservation area.
