= Tõstamaa Landscape Conservation Area =

Protected area in Estonia

- Location within Estonia
- Location: Estonia
- Coordinates: 58°18′N 24°00′E; 58°16′N 24°10′E
- Area: 1,288 ha (3,180 acres)
- Established: 1976

Tõstamaa Landscape Conservation Area is a nature park which is located in Pärnu County, Estonia.

The area of the nature park is 1288 ha.

The protected area was founded in 1976 to protect the islets Heinlaid and Kivilaid.
