= Kasti Landscape Conservation Area =

Protected area in Estonia

- Location within Estonia
- Location: Estonia
- Coordinates: 58°15′N 22°38′E
- Area: 500 ha (1,200 acres)
- Established: 2000 (2018)

Kasti Landscape Conservation Area is a nature park situated in Saare County, Estonia.

Its area is 500 ha.

The protected area was designated in 2000 to protect landscapes and biodiversity of Southern Saaremaa.
