= Kastna Landscape Conservation Area =

Protected area in Estonia

- Location within Estonia
- Location: Estonia
- Coordinates: 58°19′N 23°54′E
- Area: 123 ha (300 acres)
- Established: 2007

Kastna Landscape Conservation Area is a nature park situated in Pärnu County, Estonia.

Its area is 123 ha.

The protected area was designated in 2007 to protect coast areas typical to Western Estonia; also theirs biodiversity.
