= Buddhism in Estonia =

Buddhism in Estonia is a small minority religion, held by about 0.2% of the population. However, between 2000 and 2021, the number of Buddhists in Estonia tripled.

== History ==
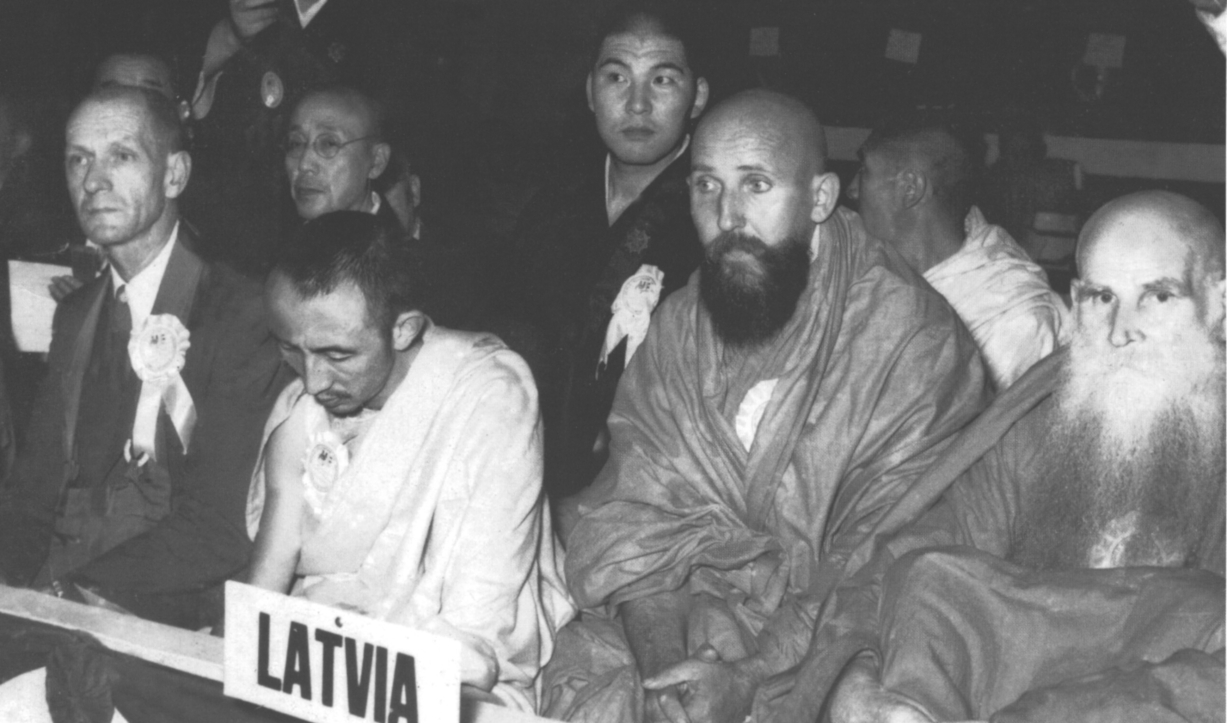
Martin Steinke (German Buddhist delegate), Kushok Bakula Rinpoche, Friedrich Voldemar Lustig, and Karl Tõnisson (on the right) represented Latvia as delegates at the congress of the World Buddhist Federation in Rangoon 1954 at the opening of the Sixth Buddhist Council

The emergence of Buddhism in Estonia is attributed to the early 20th century and associated with the names of Karl Tõnisson and his disciple Friedrich Lustig. Tõnisson was appointed by the 13th Dalai Lama of Tibet as the first Buddhist Archbishop of Lithuania, Latvia, and Estonia. He died in 1962 in Thailand after which he was declared a bodhisattva.

Another important figure who contributed to the development of Estonian Buddhism was the scholar and religious philosopher Uku Masing. He wrote a book about Buddhism and became the founder of the Estonian Oriental Society. Under his influence, the Estonian buddhologist Linnart Mäll was formed. He translated many sacred texts into Estonian, because although Buddhism, like other religions, was not welcomed by the Soviet authorities of the Estonian SSR, scientific research in this field was allowed.

== Statistics ==
According to Statistics Estonia, the Estonian government agency responsible for producing official statistics, in 2021, there were 1,880 Buddhists in Estonia (0.2%). Of these, 1,05 are male and 820 female. 1,280 are classified as city inhabitants, 100 as town inhabitants, and 500 as rural inhabitants.

Religious affiliations in Estonia, census 2000–2021 (Note: The censuses of Estonia count the religious affiliations of the population older than 15 years of age.)
| Religion | 2000 | | 2011 | | 2021 | |
| Religion | Number | % | Number | % | Number | % |
|---|---|---|---|---|---|---|
| Christianity | 319,770 | 28.5% | 310,481 | 28.4% | 298,410 | 26.8% |
| Islam | 1,387 | 0.1% | 1,508 | 0.1% | 5,800 | 0.5% |
| Estonian Neopaganism | 1,058 | 0.1% | 2,972 | 0.3% | 5,630 | 0.5% |
| Buddhism | 622 | 0.1% | 1,145 | 0.1% | 1,880 | 0.2% |
| Other religions (Note: Mostly other modern Paganisms, with a smaller number of other Eastern religions and Theosophical movements.) | 4,995 | 0.4% | 4,727 | 0.4% | 9,630 | 0.9% |
| No religion | 450,458 | 40.2% | 592,588 | 54.1% | 650,900 | 58.4% |
| Not stated (Note: Comprises the categories "cannot define", "refuse to answer" and "religious affiliation unknown".) | 343,292 | 30.6% | 181,104 | 16.5% | 141,780 | 12.7% |
| Total population | 1,121,582 | | 1,094,564 | | 1,114,030 | |

== See also ==
- Buddhism in Lithuania
- Buddhism in Finland
- Demographics of Estonia
- Religion in Estonia
- Irreligion in Estonia
- Jaan Kaplinski
