= 2000 Estonian census =

Census in Estonia

2000 Population and Housing Census (PHC 2000) (Estonian: Rahva ja eluruumide loendus (REL 2000)) was a census that was carried out during 31 March 2000 – 9 April 2000 in Estonia by Statistics Estonia.

The total population recorded was 1,370,052 persons and 67.9% of them were Estonians. Compared to the 1989 Estonia Census, the population had decreased by 195,000 persons (12.5%).

== See also ==
- Demographics of Estonia
