= Onorio Ruotolo =

American poet

Onorio Rafaelle Ruotolo
- Born: March 3, 1888; Cervinara, Italy
- Died: December 18, 1966 (aged 78); New York, New York
- Years active: 1914–1966
- Notable work: sculptor
- Children: Lucio Ruotolo
- Relatives: Lokanatha

Onorio Ruotolo (1888–1966) was an Italian-American sculptor and poet, once known as the "Rodin of Little Italy."

== Biography ==
Ruotolo was born in Cervinara, Italy.

He studied at the Royal Academy of Fine Arts in Naples and emigrated to the United States in 1908. The struggle and poverty he observed in New York City engendered a concern for society, which he expressed in cartoons, poetry, and sculpture.

During World War I, Ruotolo produced a number of sculptures showing the horrors of war. In 1914, he and Arturo Giovannitti became co-directors of Il Fuoco, a magazine of art and politics. After an ideological split, Ruotolo began Minosse, a socio-literary publication.

In 1923 Ruotolo founded the Leonardo da Vinci Art School on Manhattan's Lower East Side. The school was created to provide arts education for New York's immigrant community and remained in operation for almost twenty years.

In 1924, Isamu Noguchi took his first sculpture class at the Leonardo da Vinci Art School. Noguchi began his artistic career with the academic sculpture he created as Ruotolo's protégé.

In 1925, he began publishing Leonardo, an annual magazine from the school.

In the 1940s and 1960s, Ruotolo turned to poetry and prose. From 1950 to 1957 served as an aide of the Amalgamated Clothing Workers of America.

Ruotolo died at home on Bank Street, New York City, on December 18, 1966.

== Works ==
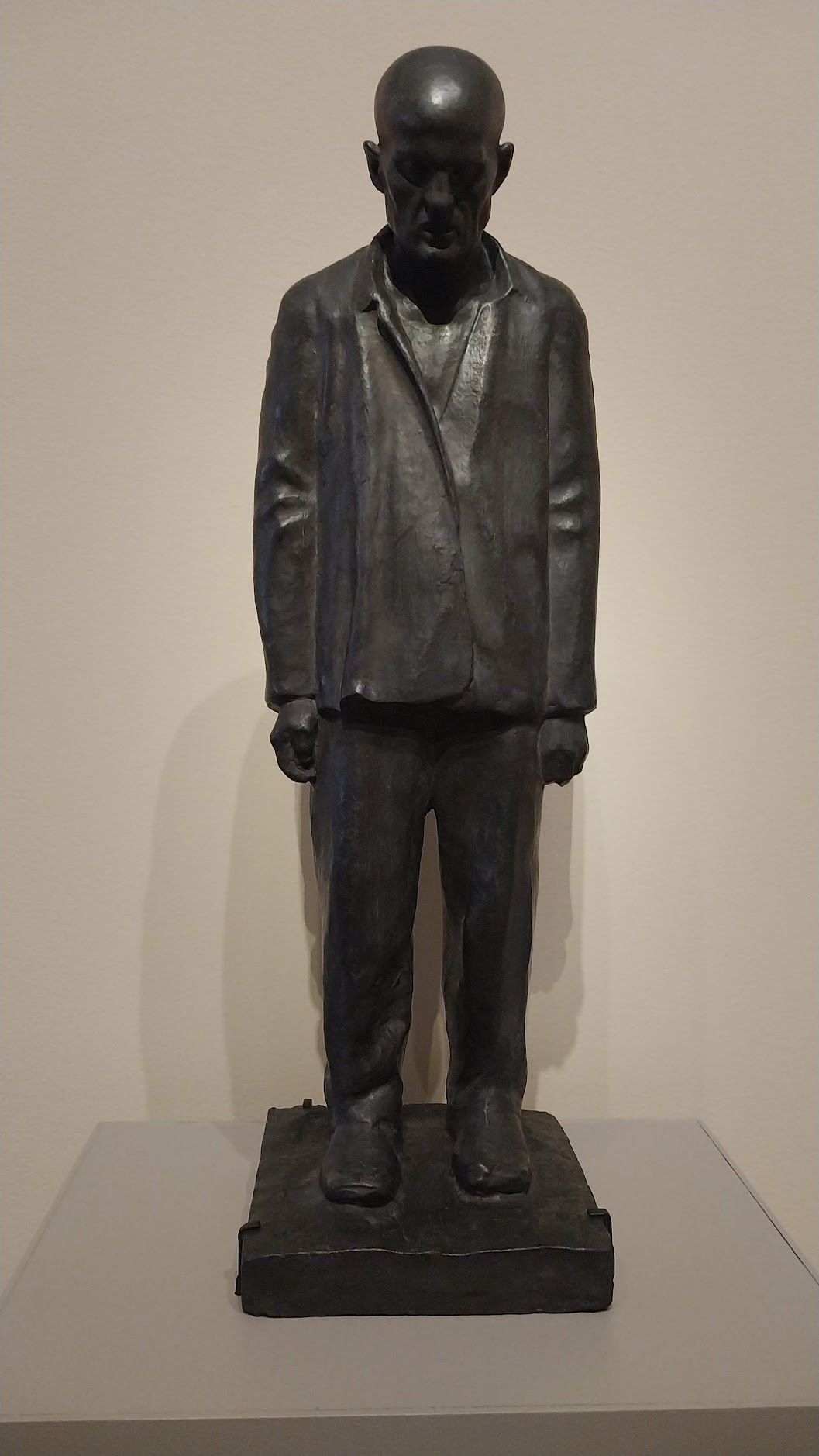
"The Doomed," 1917 sculpture by Onorio Ruotolo about the death penalty

Ruotolo was most well known for his portrait sculpture, including busts of Enrico Caruso, Arturo Toscannini, Thomas Edison, Theodore Dreiser, Helen Keller, Albert Einstein, Benito Mussolini, and the "Four Freedoms."

Sculptures:

- Buried Alive
- The Wishing Squad

In addition to his career as sculptor and teacher, Ruotolo also was a critic, editor, poet, illustrator and cartoonist under the nom de plume "Bayard".

Books:

- The Italians in America Before the Civil War by Giovanni Schiavo and Onorio Ruotolo (1934)
- The Story of the World's Literature, by John Albert Macy, illustrated by Onorio Ruotolo (New York: Boni & Liveright, 1935)

== Legacy ==
Francis Winwar wrote an appreciation for Ruotolo, Man and Artist: More Than One Hundred Reproductions of His Works in 1949.

Ruotolo's biography was written by photojournalist, his countryman, Angelo Marchese in 2003. The book, published by Il Caudino, is entitled Onorio Ruotolo, un figlio dimenticato.

In 2004, Joseph Sciorra and Peter G. Vellon curated the exhibition "The Art of Freedom: Onorio Ruotolo and the Leonardo da Vinci School."

Ruotolo appears in the memoirs of Lewis Mumford, as Ruotolo fell in love with the same woman that Mumford had been seeing and would later marry, Sophia Wittenberg:

That his seduction was not successful was hardly a consolation to me: even when it was coupled with the fact that she had withdrawn her consent to pose for him when she discovered that it was not her beautiful head but her naked body that he wanted to model ... Though rebuffed at their first meeting, Ruotolo, the sculptor, his passion perhaps inflamed by denial, resumed his pursuit; and Sophia, who was at that time not at all sure she wanted a permanent relationship with anyone, ironically had the virtuous ambivalent reward for denying easy access to her body; in a little while, Ruotolo proposed marriage as the only way left for attaining his goal. If she had been ready for any closer relation then, he might have been successful: but he made the mistake of taking her to a great Italian dinner in Brooklyn, presided over by the famous Italian anarchist, Carlo Tresca, to honor the longshoremen who had refused to load munitions to be used against the Communist armies of Soviet Russia. She noted with surprise that so few woman were present and asked, naively, where the wives were: "Wives? An Italian wife stays at home." That settled for Sophia even his more honorable efforts.

== Relatives ==
Ruotolo was first cousin to the first Italian Buddhist monk, Lokanatha. The Italian actor, director, playwright and singer Leopoldo Mastelloni, born in 1945, is the direct great-grandson of Onorio Ruotolo because the sister of Onorio, Annamaria Ruotolo was the mother of Elisabetta Virgilio, married to the Marquis Franco Mastelloni of Capograssi and Duke of Castelvetere, mother of Leopoldo Mastelloni.

== See also ==
- Lokanatha
- Leonardo da Vinci Art School
- Isamu Noguchi

== Sources ==
- "Onorio Ruotolo papers, 1915-1966". Immigration History Research Center Archives.
- "Onorio Ruotolo". Smithsonian American Art Museum.
- "Sculptures and Photographs: by Onorio Ruotolo and the Leonardo da Vinci Art School". Italian-American Museum. 2003.
- "Lucio Ruotolo, longtime professor of English, dies at 76". Stanford University. July 21, 2003.
