= Leonardo da Vinci Art School =

Former art school in New York City

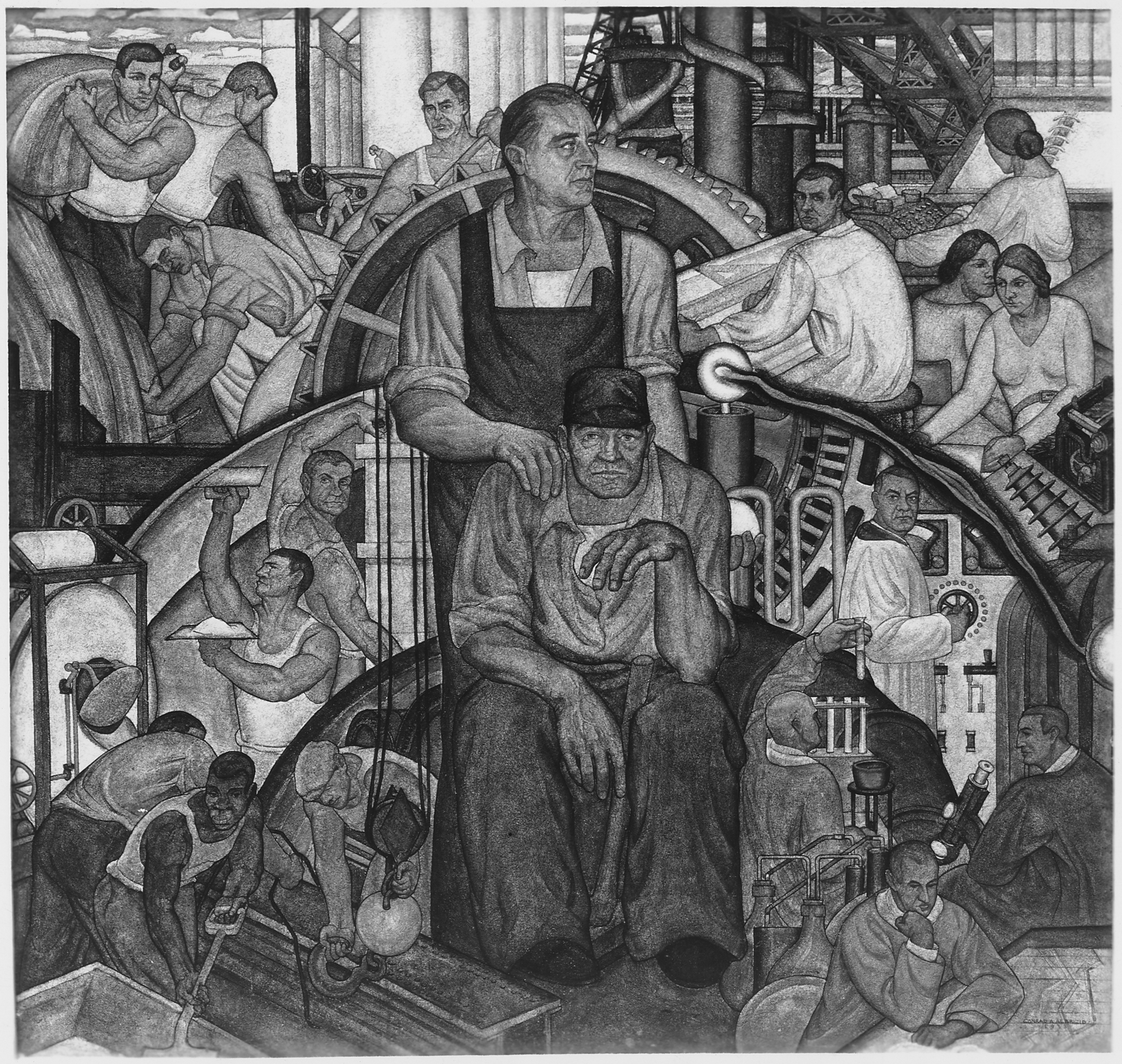
- The New Deal, mural by Conrad Albrizio (1934)
- 288 East 10th Street, New York City, NY; United States

Information
- Type: Art school
- Opened: December 1923
- Closed: April 28, 1942
- Principal: Onorio Ruotolo

The Leonardo da Vinci Art School (the "Leonardo") was an art school founded in New York City (1923–1942), whose most famous students were Isamu Noguchi and Elaine de Kooning, the school's director was sculptor and poet Onorio Ruotolo.

== History ==
=== First decade ===
With sculptor Attilio Piccirilli, Ruotolo founded the school to provide low-cost, often free art instruction to the working poor, mostly in the evening. The school was first located at St. Nicholas of Myra, Christian Orthodox Church, 288 East 10th Street, off Avenue A and near Tompkins Square Park. Tuition was six dollars ($6) per month—or free. Students in the 1920s included Noguchi and Esther Shemitz.

To foster Noguchi's decision to study sculpture, Ruotolo offered him a job that paid as much as other work he had. Later, Noguchi recalled, "How could I resist? I became a sculptor, even against my will." After only three months at the "Leonardo" (as the school was known), Noguchi held a solo exhibition. Ruotolo also helped Noguchi get commissions for outside sculpture work.

=== Second decade ===
In 1934, the school reorganized and reopened at 149 East 34th Street, graced by "The New Deal" mural of Conrad Albrizio. With political and union backing, the school expanded to include the "Friends of Italian Arts Association," eliminating tuition altogether, so that student needed provide only their own art materials. No employees received payment for their services. For the school's rededication, Mayor Fiorello LaGuardia unveiled a fresco symbolic of the New Deal.

=== Closure ===
Contributions diminished significantly during World War II, leading to the Leonardo's closture at its third and final location at 130 East 16th Street on April 28, 1942.

== Legacy ==
In addition to starting the career of Noguchi, the Leonardo also was the only school in its time to teach the art of fresco painting.

== Associated people ==
=== Instructors ===
- Attilio Piccirilli Co-founder
- Onorio Ruotolo Co-founder, Director
- John Sennhauser
- Alfredo Mussela
- Nicholas Volpe
- Rosario Gerbino, (Still Life)
- Cesare Stea (From 1935-1938)
- Aldo Lazzarini (Italian Muralist)
- Michele Falanga Co-Founder, Director.

=== Alumni ===
- Peter Agostini
- Nicolas Carone
- Angelo Ippolito
- Elaine de Kooning
- Isamu Noguchi
- Esther Shemitz
- Joe De Santis
- Vincent La Gambina
- José Greco
- Santí Marino

== Associated art ==
- "The New Deal" by Conrad A. Albrizio (1934), placed in the Auditoriom of the Leonardo da Vinci Art School at 149 East 34th Street, NYC
- "Cantus" by Onorio Ruotolo (1933)
- Depression Art Gallery
