= Mustahamba =

Mustahamba may refer to several places in Estonia:

- Mustahamba, Võru County, village in Rõuge Parish, Võru County, Estonia
- Mustahamba, former name of Kahrila-Mustahamba, village in Rõuge Parish, Võru County, Estonia
