= Lokanātha =

Italian Buddhist missionary (1897–1966)

Personal life
- Born: Salvatore Cioffi; December 26, 1897 Cervinara, Campania, Italy
- Died: May 25, 1966 (aged 68) Pyin U Lwin, Mandalay, Burma
- Resting place: Shwezigon Pagoda
- Education: Cooper Union (BSc)
- Occupation: Monk

Religious life
- Religion: Buddhism
- School: Theravāda
- Dharma names: Lokanātha လောကနာထ
- Ordination: 1925

Senior posting
- Influenced: B. R. Ambedkar

Lokanātha (legal name: Salvatore Cioffi; December 26, 1897 - May 25, 1966) was an Italian Buddhist missionary.

== Early life ==
Lokanatha was born near Naples in Cervinara, Italy in 1897 in the celebrated family of Cioffi and given the name of Salvatore, meaning the Savior. Brought up in an atmosphere of culture, he was a talented violinist. He studied chemistry and received his B.Sc. at The Cooper Union for the Advancement of Science and Art, in 1922. He then worked as a chemical analyst for the Crucible Steel Co. and Procter & Gamble before briefly attending Columbia University Medical School. It was the scientific impulse in him which led him to Buddhism, which he embraced not long after graduation. Shortly he was on pilgrimage to the places sacred to Buddhism and was ordained a Buddhist monk in Burma in 1925. Thereafter, he resolved to propagate the teachings of the Buddha all over the world.

Returning home after mastering the precepts and practices of Buddhism in six months, he found the general atmosphere not favorable to his new religion in Italy. He returned to India on foot walking across Southern Europe and Asia Minor, reaching back Burma in 1928. The five years that followed were spent in deep study and meditations, his time being divided between monasteries and the Himalayan caves and forests. Strictly observing the 13 dhutangas, he emerged towards the end of 1932 with a spiritual radiance around him. From the year 1928 throughout his life he observed the self-imposed rule of sleeping in the sitting posture: only in his death he lay on his back.

== Buddhism ==
Three Buddhist missionary expeditions were launched by Lokanatha in the years 1933, 1934 and 1935 from Burma, Thailand and Ceylon respectively to Bodh Gaya in India, where the Buddha had attained Enlightenment. Lokanatha wrote extensively and published several booklets with a view to use these in his missionary expeditions in the West; he also completed a large volume dealing with his missionary work in the East. While the plans for a missionary tour of Europe and America were getting finalized, World War II broke out. All of Lokanatha's writings were lost. Besides, during the War he was interned in India.

In October, 1946, he returning to Burma and found the Buddhist Foreign Mission organized in Mandalay; under the auspices of which he was sent out in July 1947 for a Buddhist survey of the contemporary world, with special reference to the USA. It was the first mission of its kind ever launched from Burma. The outcome of this Mission is detailed in his work Girdling the Globe with Truth. Preaching through Singapore and Malaya, Hong Kong, Shanghai and Manila, he sped across the Pacific through Hawaii to the US, and after a very successful tour of the United States and preaching in England and on the Continent, he arrived in Ceylon in 1950 to attend and address the First Conference of the World Fellowship of Buddhists. In March 1951 he was back to Burma, where right-royal receptions awaited for him in Rangoon and Mandalay. In Mandalay he hoisted the World Buddhist Flag on March 24, 1951, for the first time in Burma.

After 1951 he preached extensively and repeatedly throughout Burma, also dividing his time between Burma, India and Ceylon; mostly staying in Burma. He attended and addressed the World Fellowship of Buddhists' Conference in Rangoon in 1954. Also, he was elected the Spiritual Patron of the Mahajayanti Celebrations in 1956 in Pakistan.

It was in the early 1930s that Lokanatha and B. R. Ambedkar, the Indian Dalit leader, contacted each other. The correspondence between them reveals that Ambedkar was greatly influenced by Lokanatha, in favor of Buddhism. Ambedkar converted to Buddhism with many of his followers in 1956.

Donations for the world Dhammaduta work flowed freely to Lokanatha in Burma. He had planned for a World Preaching Tour in 1963–1965, which somehow failed to materialize. Towards the end of 1965, he developed a sore on his forehead, which turned cancerous. While preparing for his visit to the US for proper treatment, he succumbed to the temptation of trying indigenous treatment, against all expert advice. He died on May 25, 1966. On May 29, 1966, in Maymyo, his body was taken in a stately procession to the Shwezigon Monastery, where it lies in state for all Burma to pay homage. Friedrich Lustig, who had been a close associate, also attended the funeral.

During his lifetime, Lokanātha was also associated with the Finnish‑Estonian Buddhist monk Karl Tõnisson.

His donations helped construct the Sunlun Dhammayone in Rangoon. His devotees included people from all ranks of life; intellectuals, scientists and people in authority from several countries were influenced by him. Although Theravada by designation, Lokanatha was broadminded for all viewpoints.

The Light of Truth sermons delivered by Lokanatha in Singapore was edited in a book by The Supervisor of The Maha Bodhi School and distributed by the Singapore Buddhist Lodge, the Singapore Maha Bodhi School and the Singapore Buddhist Institute in 1947.

== Vegetarianism ==
Lokanatha was a strict vegetarian who lectured for the Malayan Vegetarian Society.
