= Nicholas Volpe =

American artist

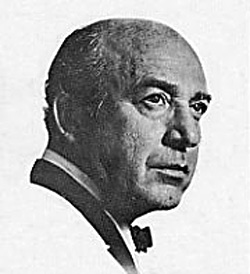
- 1962 portrait of Volpe.
- Born: Nicholas Volpe; 1911; New Haven, Connecticut
- Died: 1992 (aged 80–81); Oceanside, California
- Education: Syracuse University
- Known for: Painter and illustrator
- Notable work: Academy Award winner portraits Brown Derby recording artist portraits
- Awards: Grammy Award for Best Album Cover

Nicholas A. Volpe (1911 – 1992) was an American artist, noted for his portraits of Hollywood celebrities, presidents, sports figures, and other famous personalities. He is said to have painted more movie stars than any other artist in America.

== Early years ==
Volpe was born in New Haven, Connecticut, to an Italian immigrant family. He began his primary education there and became especially talented as a young violinist. His parents sent him to Italy to continue his violin studies, assuming he might take it up as a profession. He grew homesick for his home in the U.S. however, and soon returned to New Haven to finish his high school education.

After Volpe graduated high school, where he had also played football, he was accepted at Syracuse University on a football scholarship. Rather than major in music, he gravitated towards art as he discovered his natural talents as an artist. Upon graduation he was offered a professorship at the university to teach art. He turned down the offer, deciding that he needed more time to develop his artistic skills more fully. He subsequently entered an art contest with thousands of other contestants and was one of six who won the coveted Tiffany Foundation Art Scholarship Award. Among his prizes was the opportunity to live at a private seaside estate on Long Island where he could continue painting in seclusion.

== Career ==
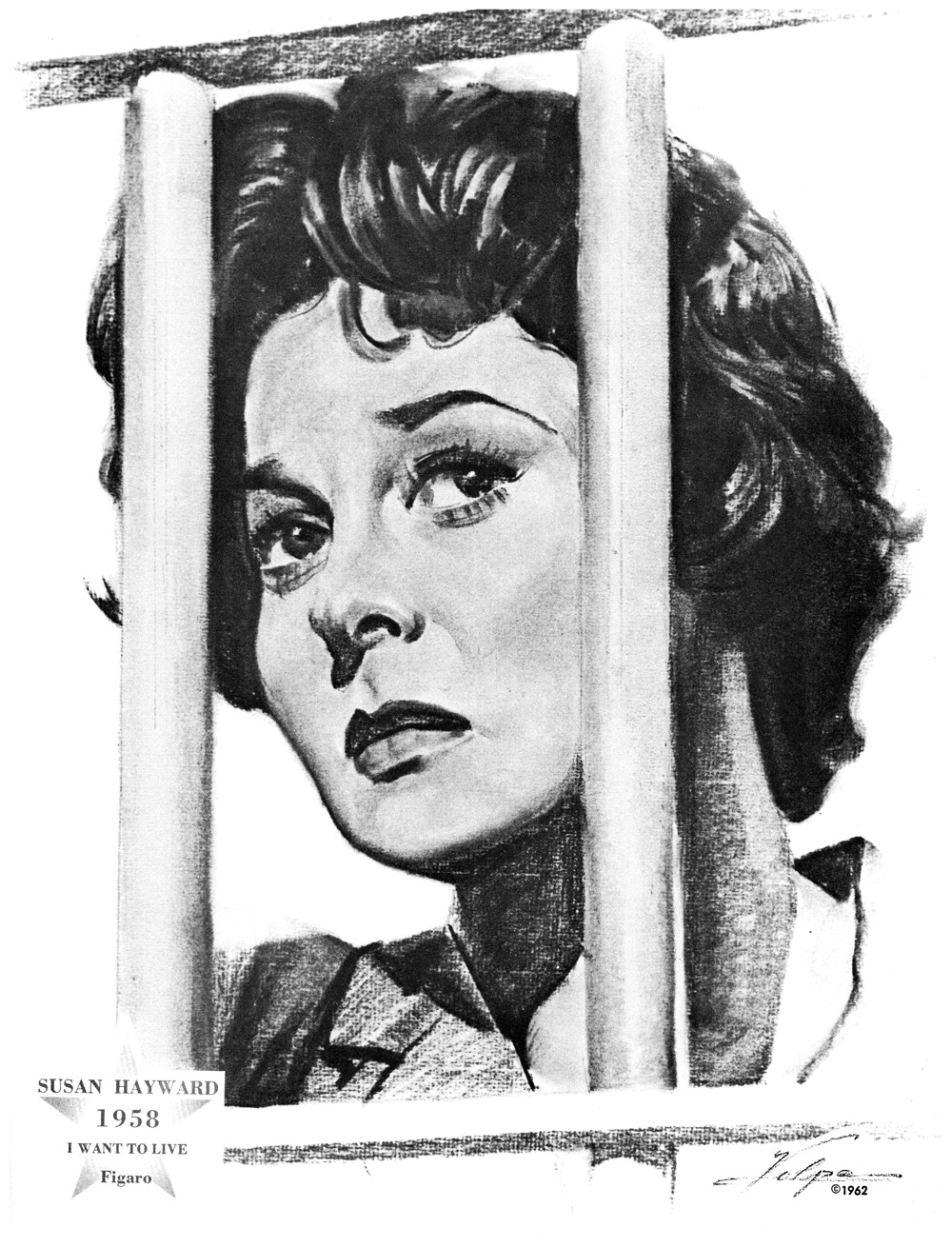
Portrait of Susan Hayward in I Want to Live! (1958)

Volpe later accepted a position as a fine art instructor at New York City's Leonardo da Vinci Art School. After a few years there he accepted the post of Dean of Arts at Jacksonville College in Florida, where he spent three years. He next decided to move to Hollywood, California after he received an offer by a studio to design film sets, create make-up and design costumes.

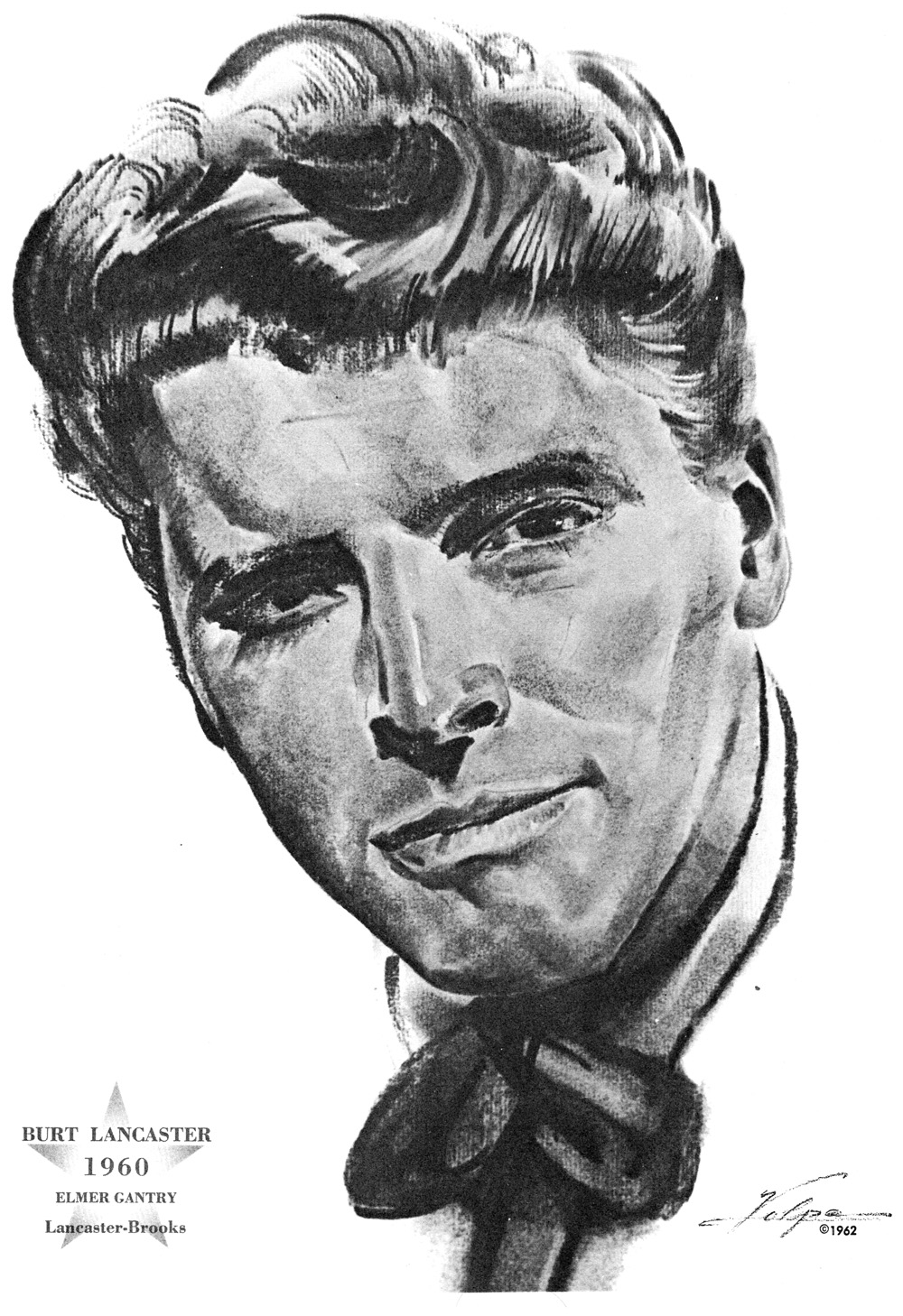
Academy Award portrait of Burt Lancaster, drawn in 1960

During this period, his talent as a portrait artist was soon noticed, as he had also by then painted or drawn portraits of various stars, and his reputation as a highly skilled artist became widely recognized. As a result, Volpe was given a lifetime contract by the Academy of Motion Pictures Arts and Sciences to paint each year's Oscar winning Best Actor and Best Actress. The majority of his Oscar portraits were made with charcoal pencil.

Beside his annual Academy Awards paintings, Vople painted commissions such as Frank Sinatra's album Only the Lonely in 1958. This earned him a Grammy Award for Best Album Cover.

During Volpe's career, he would paint Sinatra 24 times, more than any other celebrity, including a full-size painting now displayed at the Friars Club of Beverly Hills.

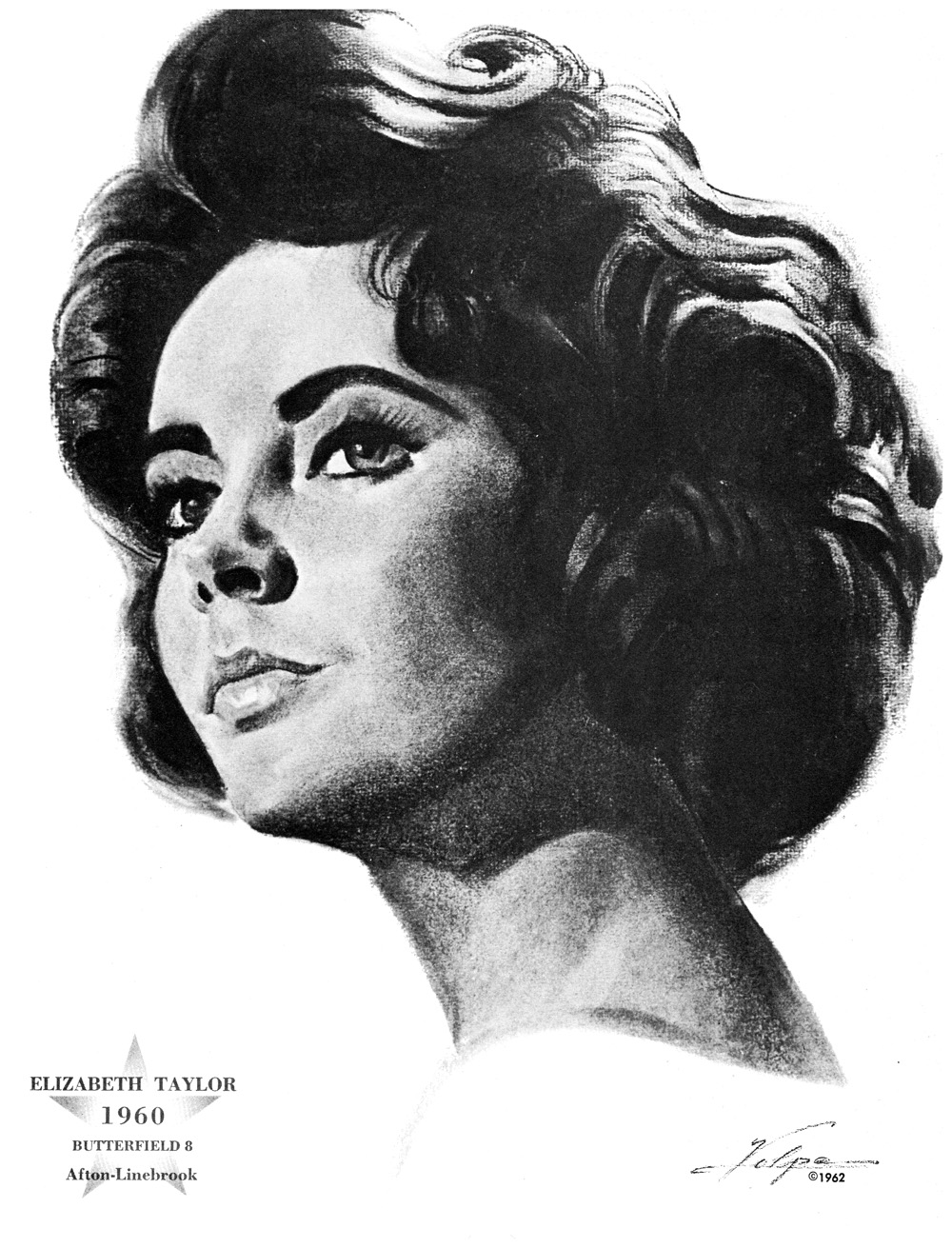
Academy Award portrait of Elizabeth Taylor, drawn in 1960

With his fame as an artist increasing, in 1964, he was commissioned by The Beatles to paint portraits of each of the four members of the group during their first American tour. Capitol Records created posters from the final illustrations. He was also commissioned to do a portrait of Johnny Cash for the Rock and Roll Hall of Fame.

After winning a Grammy he was also commissioned by Hollywood's famed Brown Derby restaurant to paint portraits of up to 200 top recording artists to be displayed in the restaurant's Hall of Fame Record Room. His Oscar paintings were displayed in the restaurant's "Academy Room," created for showing Volpe's art. On other occasions, he was asked to paint the team members of the Los Angeles Dodgers baseball team, and various other sports teams had likewise commissioned his art. Along with stars and sports figures, he painted portraits of leading political figures, including John F. Kennedy, Winston Churchill, Dwight D. Eisenhower and Ronald Reagan. He traveled to Israel to paint its first Prime Minister, David Ben Gurion.

Volpe wrote and illustrated a regular newspaper column in the Los Angeles Herald Examiner, with articles covering various travel topics about California. He also traveled across the country during tours where he appeared on television, gave radio interviews, and spoke to audiences at various events. In 1973 he returned to teaching art at Pepperdine University in Malibu, California.

== Personal life ==
He spent his career living in Southern California, where he would marry and raise his three children. He and his wife spent much of their vacation time traveling throughout Mexico in their motor home, which inspired him to paint hundreds of scenics and portraits of Mexicans. He died in Oceanside, California, following a stroke, on February 11, 1992. He was 80.
