= Conrad Albrizio =

American painter

- Born: 1894; New York City, U.S.
- Died: 1973 (aged 78–79)
- Occupation: Painter

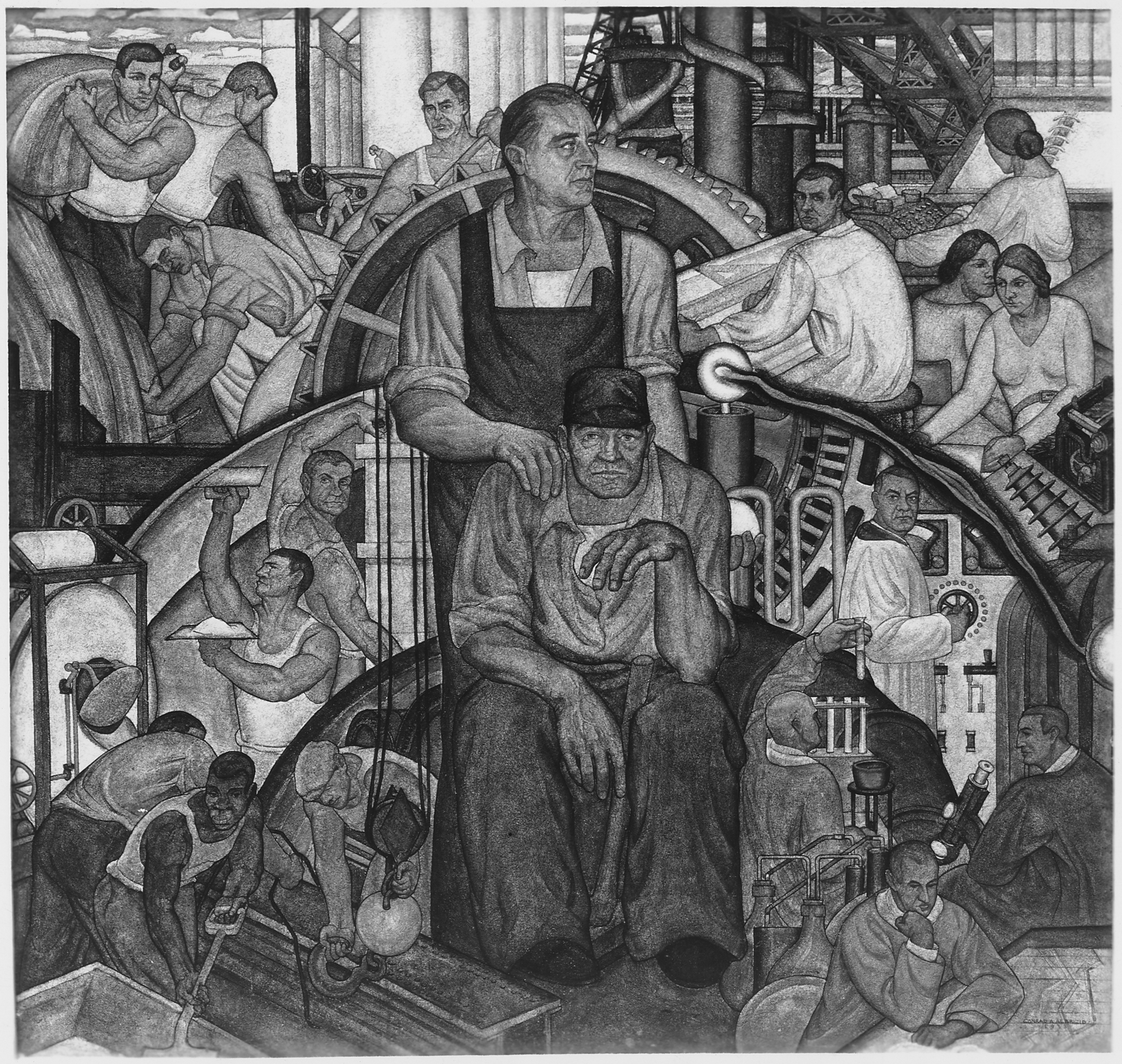
The New Deal (1934), fresco by Albrizio in the auditorium of the Leonardo da Vinci Art School, New York City

Conrad Albrizio (1894–1973) was an American muralist. Born in New York City, he was trained in France and Italy. He taught at Louisiana State University from 1936 to 1953, and he painted many murals in Louisiana.
