= Kahrila-Mustahamba =

Village in Estonia

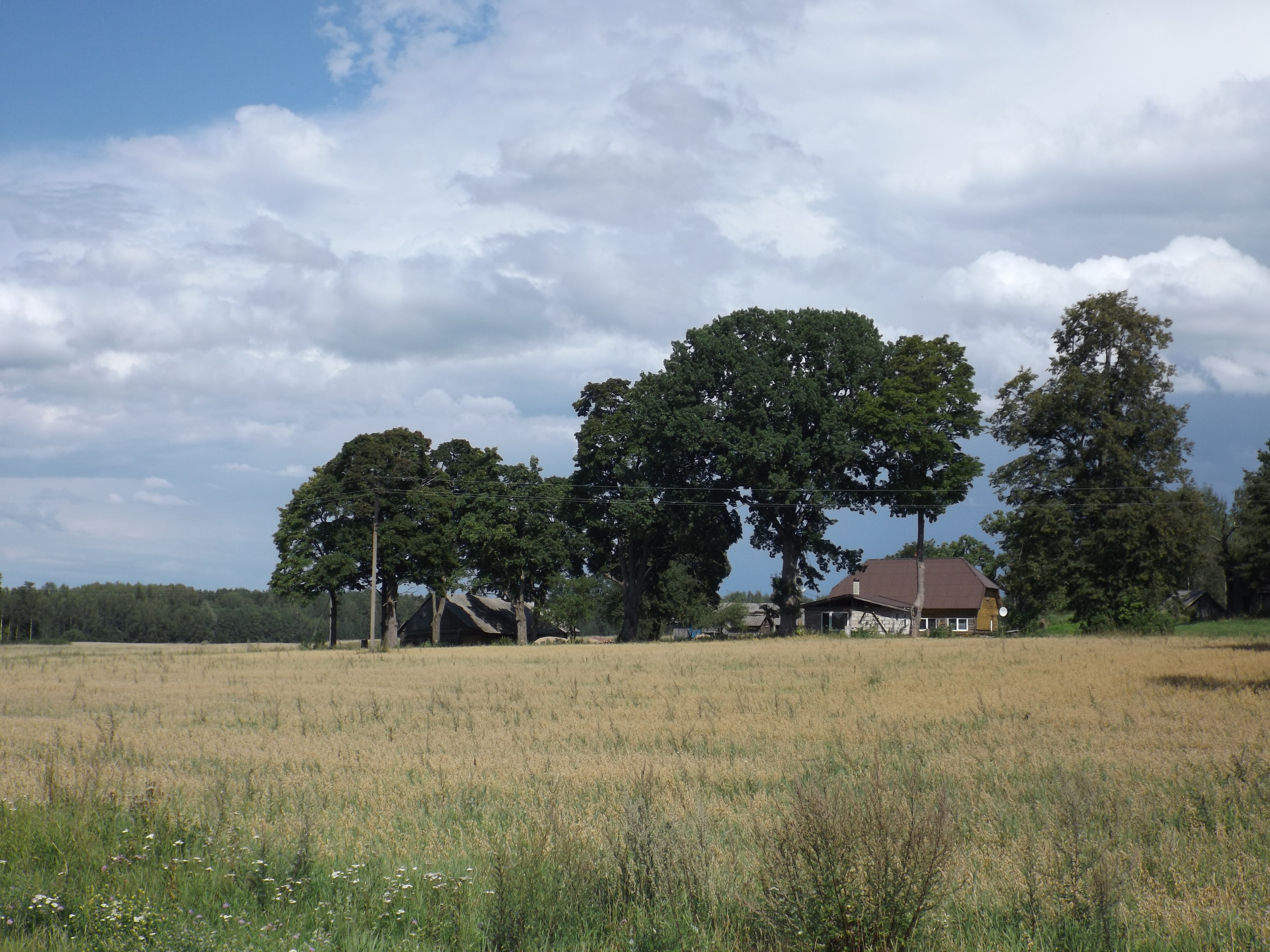
- Farmstead in Kahrila-Mustahamba

- Location within Estonia
- Coordinates: 57°45′35″N 26°53′5″E
- Country: Estonia
- County: Võru County
- Time zone: UTC+2 (EET)

Kahrila-Mustahamba is a settlement in Rõuge Parish, Võru County in southeastern Estonia. According to a 2021 census by the Statistical Office of Estonia, the population of Kahrila-Mustahamba is 17.
