= Karl Tõnisson =

Estonian Buddhism monk

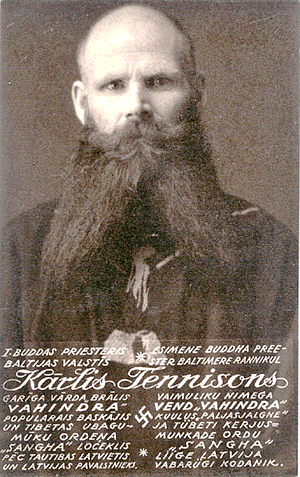
Karl Tõnisson—Karlis Tenisson—Brother Vahindra year 1928

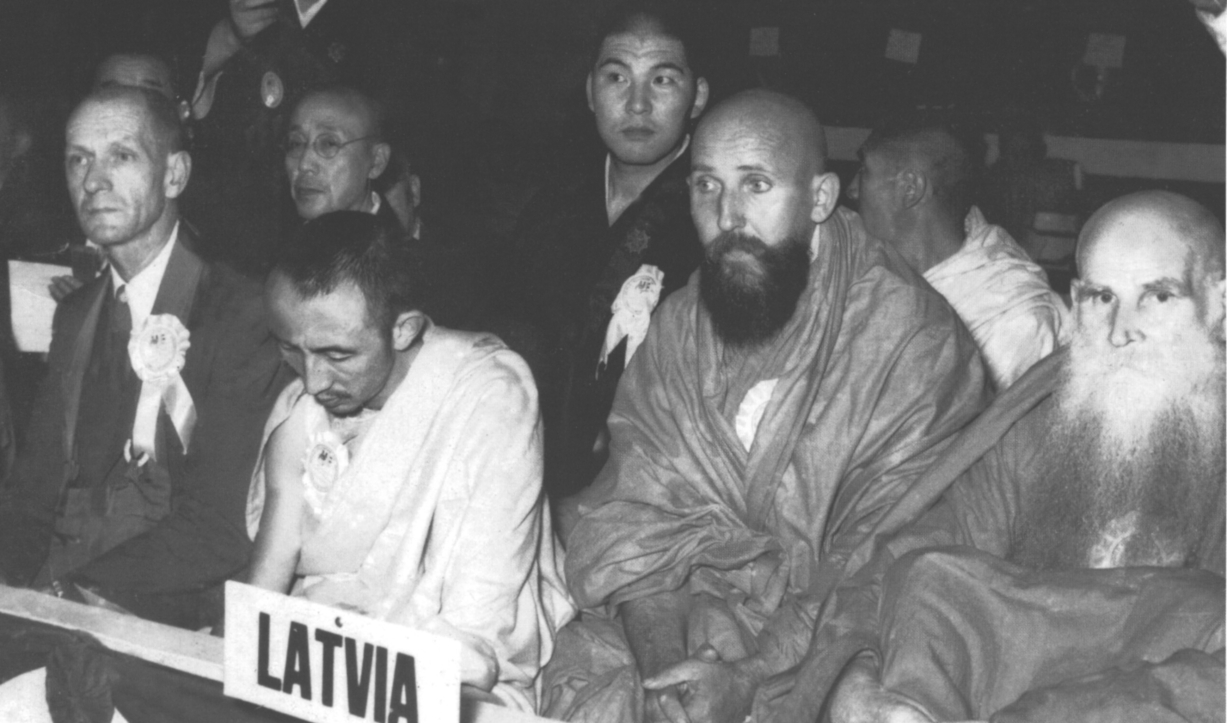
Martin Steinke (German Buddhist delegate), Kushok Bakula Rinpoche, Friedrich Voldemar Lustig, and Karl Tõnisson (on the right) represented Latvia as delegates at the congress of the World Buddhist Federation in Rangoon 1954 at the opening of the Sixth Buddhist Council

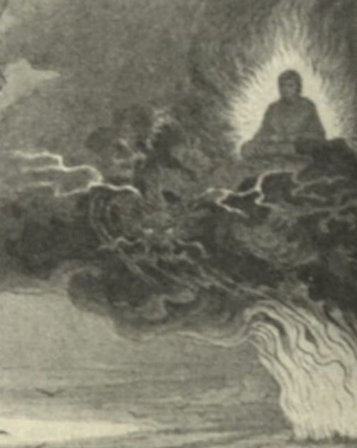
Buddha, Hermann Knackfüß's and Wilhelm II's print (1895) illustrates Brother Vahindra's book "One and one's disciples adhere to" (1930)

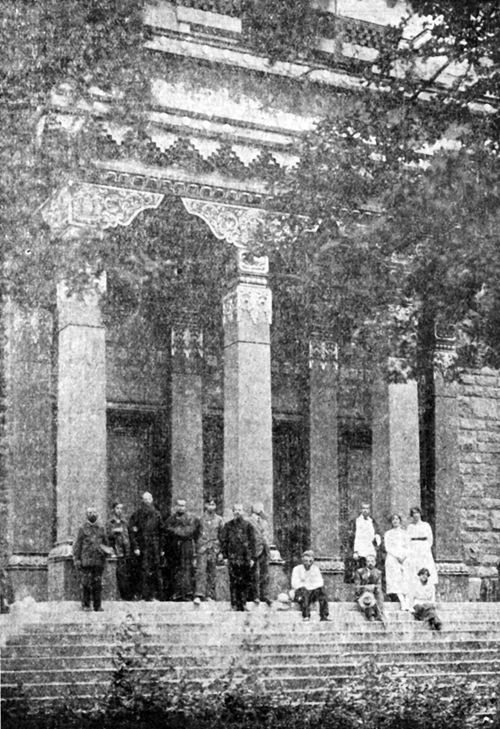
Karl Tõnisson third from the left in front of Saint Petersburg’s largest Buddhist Temple Datsan Gunzechoinei

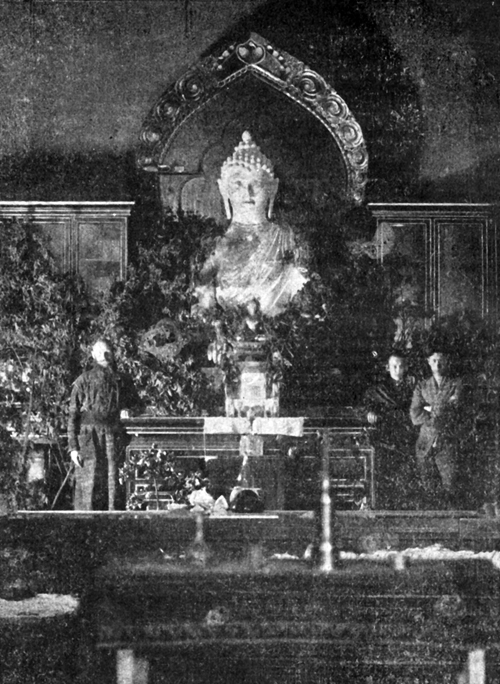
Karl Tõnisson on the left next to a Buddha statue at Saint Petersburg’s largest Buddhist Temple Datsan Gunzechoinei

Karl August Tõnisson (Latvian: Kārlis Tennisons; 20 August (Jc 8 August) 1883 – 5 May 1962) also known as Brother Vahindra (Estonian: Vend Vahindra) and Barefoot Tõnisson (Estonian: Paljasjalgne Tõnisson), was an Estonian writer and religious figure. One of the first Estonians to engage with Buddhism, he was generally seen as eccentric but had a significant impact on Estonian views of Buddhism. In 1930 he left Europe for Thailand, later settling in Burma, dying in Rangoon, aged 78.

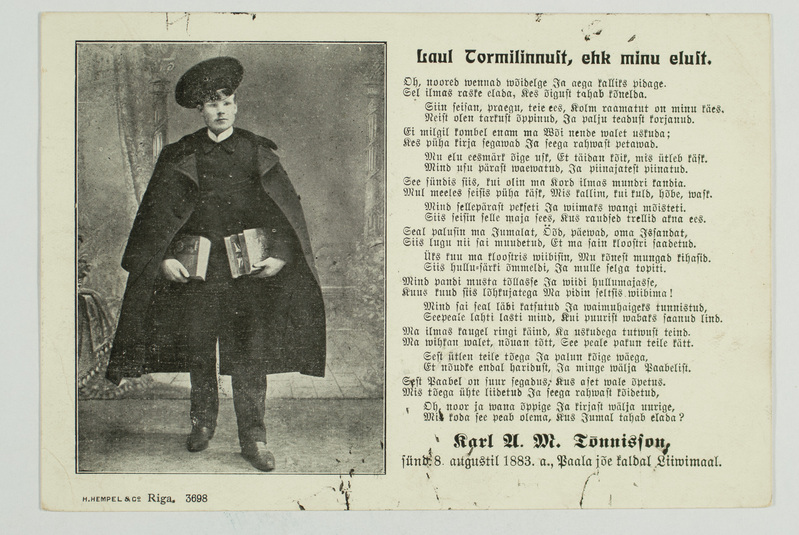
Publication titled "Song of the Stormbird, about my life." authored by Karl A.M. Tõnisson, during the years 1905-1910 in Riga.

== Early life ==
Tõnisson was born in Umbusi in 1883 into a Lutheran farming family. His parents died at an early age (his father in 1891 and his mother in 1895) after which he was raised by his uncle.

== Life and writings ==
In the 1900s Tõnisson travelled to Riga, where he likely met local Theosophists. Around 1910 he moved to St. Petersburg, where he likely met Agvan Dorzhiev and other Kalmyk and Buryat lamas. He got intrested of Buddhism around this time, and likely helped build the Datsan Gunzechoinei.

At the start of the First World War he was drafted into the Imperial Russian Army, but released soon afterwards.

In 1915 he moved to Tallinn. In 1917 he returned to Russia, where he stayed until 1923. He spent part of this time guarding the Datsan Gunzechoinei building site.

In 1923 he returned to Latvia after unsuccessfully attempting to return Estonia. Possibly becoming 10 years older around this time.

In 1930 he met Friedrich V. Lustig, who became his disciple and followed him on his travels for the rest of his life.

In 1931 the two left Europe for Thailand, wanting to go to Tibet. During and after World War II Tõnisson and Lustig became involved in Thai politics, raising a Red Soviet like flag on their roof and criticizing Thailand's wartime collaboration with Japan. As a result they were expelled from Thailand into Burma in 1949.

They eventually integrated into the Burmese Buddhist community. At one point they lived at Chan Htoon's family shrine. They participated in the third and fourth World Fellowship of Buddhists conferences. The Dalai Lama sent condolences to Lustig when Tõnisson died in 1962.

In various writings, elements of his biography are misunderstood, including his date and place of birth.

== See also ==
- Buddhism in Estonia

== Sources ==
- Belka, Lubos (1999) Buddhism in Estonia, Religion, State and Society, 27:2, 245-248, DOI: 10.1080/096374999106656. Buddhism in Estonia
- Talts, Mait (2008). “The First Buddhist Priest on the Baltic Coast”: Karlis Tennison and the Introduction of Buddhism in Estonia. Folklore. Vol. 38. Pages 67–112. doi:10.7592/FEJF2008.38.talts
- Talts, M. (2015). "Karlis A. M. Tennisons and Friedrich V. Lustig – the first ‘practicing’ Buddhist in Estonia." In When Gods spoke. Researches and Reflections on Religious Phenomena and Artefacts. Studia in honorem Tarmo Kulmar (pp. 379–405). University of Tartu Press. (PDF) Karlis A. M. Tennisons and Friedrich V. Lustig – the first ‘practicing’ Buddhist in Estonia
- Tõnisson, Karl
