= Buddhism in Lithuania =

The roots of Buddhism in Lithuania can be traced to the 20th century, although the time of its first introduction there remains unknown. Zen Buddhism practiced in Lithuania today originated in Korea. There are a few active communities across the country including Vilnius, Kaunas, Klaipėda, Šiauliai, Panevėžys and Šakiai.

== History ==
The first public Dharma talk in Lithuania was given in Kaunas in 1990 by Pawel Karppowich, the Polish student of Seung Sahn. The Kaunas Zen Kwan Um center was officially registered in April 1991, soon followed by a similar group in Vilnius, established after the visit of the Zen Master. The Vilnius Kwan Um Zen community grew under the support of Zen Master Wu Bong's frequent visits.

The Vilnius International Kwan Um School of Zen Buddhism was officially registered as a religious community in Lithuania in 1991.

Zen Master Su Bong Sunim, the guiding teacher of the Hong Kong Kwan Um Sangha, opened the first Zen Temple, Ko Bong Sa, in Vilnius in 1993. Daily Zen practice is held at the Kaunas Zen Kwan Um Center since 2007.

== Zen Buddhism in Lithuania today ==
The 14th Dalai Lama Tenzin Gyatso has visited Lithuania twice and met with the President Valdas Adamkus and the Catholic Cardinal Audrys Juozas Bačkis. In 2009 supporters of Tibetan independence suggested giving its name to one of the parks in Vilnius as a gratitude for the Dalai Lama's support for the Lithuanian independence movement of the 1990s.

In 2009 The Days of Tibetan Culture (Lithuanian language: "Tibeto kultūros dienos") were held in Vilnius, attended by Indian Buddhist monks.

Probably the most prominent Lithuanian Zen Buddhist is a TV journalist and a former head of the international non-governmental organisation Transparency International, Rytis Juozapavičius, who is also the abbot of Vilnius Zen Center, Ko Bong Sa.
