= Vincent La Gambina =

American artist

Vincent La Gambina was born in Sicily in 1909 and immigrated to the United States in 1920. He was orphaned soon after arriving, and he turned to painting to support himself. He sold his first painting to Fiorello La Guardia at the age of 15.

He painted Manhattan's Union Square and Greenwich Village areas throughout his life, as well as Coney Island, Washington Square, the Bronx Zoo, and seascapes. Working predominantly in oil and painting on canvas, his style has been characterized as having a renaissance compensation while using impressionist color.

During World War II he served with the U.S. army and was stationed at Fort Jay, New York. After the war he received Veterans scholarships and studied at the Arts Students League and the Academy of Rome. He worked as a muralist and easel painter. He supervised various programs in the WPA creating many works.

Many of his paintings are in museums and private collections. The museums that exhibit his works include the Museum of the City of New York, and the Wichita Museum of Art. Private collections include Moody's and the Butler Institute of Art in Youngstown, Ohio.

La Gambina died in 1994.
