= Demographics of Estonia =

- Population: 1,360,745 (2026)
- Growth rate: −0.5% (2026)
- Birth rate: 7.06 births/1,000 population (2024)
- Death rate: 11.48 deaths/1,000 population (2024)
- Life expectancy: 79.5 years (2024)
  - male: 75.1 years
  - female: 84.4 years
- Fertility rate: 1.16 children born/woman (2025)
- Infant mortality: 1.50 deaths/1,000 live births
- Net migration rate: +5.29 migrant(s)/1,000 population (2021)

Age structure
- 0–14 years: 16.35%
- 15–64 years: 63.22%
- 65 and over: 20.43%

Sex ratio
- Total: 0.91 male(s)/female (2021 census)
- Under 15: 1.05 male(s)/female
- 65 and over: 0.54 male(s)/female

Nationality
- Nationality: Estonian
- Major ethnic: Estonians (68.2%)
- Minor ethnic: Russians (20.9%)

Language
- Official: Estonian
- Spoken: Estonian, Russian, English

The demographics of Estonia in the 21st century result from historical trends over more than a thousand years, as with most European countries, but have been disproportionately influenced by events in the second half of the 20th century. The Soviet occupation (1944–1991), extensive immigration from Russia and other parts of the former USSR, and the eventual restoration of independence of Estonia, have all had a major effect on Estonia's current ethnic makeup. The influx was largely due to the country's troubled demographics and continued need for labour. After its independence, Estonia continued to bring in the needed labour power from the same countries as it did during the Soviet times.

The languages spoken in Estonia largely reflect the composition of the indigenous and immigrant ethnic groups residing in Estonia, and thus have changed with historical trends affecting the ethnic makeup of the country. Similarly to other northern European peoples, religion plays a rather small part in the lives of most Estonians.

Overall, the quality-of-life indices for Estonia indicate a modern industrial state. The population declined annually from 1991 until 2016, except for a brief pause in 2010. Since 2016 immigration has exceeded emigration, making the overall population grow.

Estonia animated population pyramid

== Population size and structure ==
Population decline in Estonia

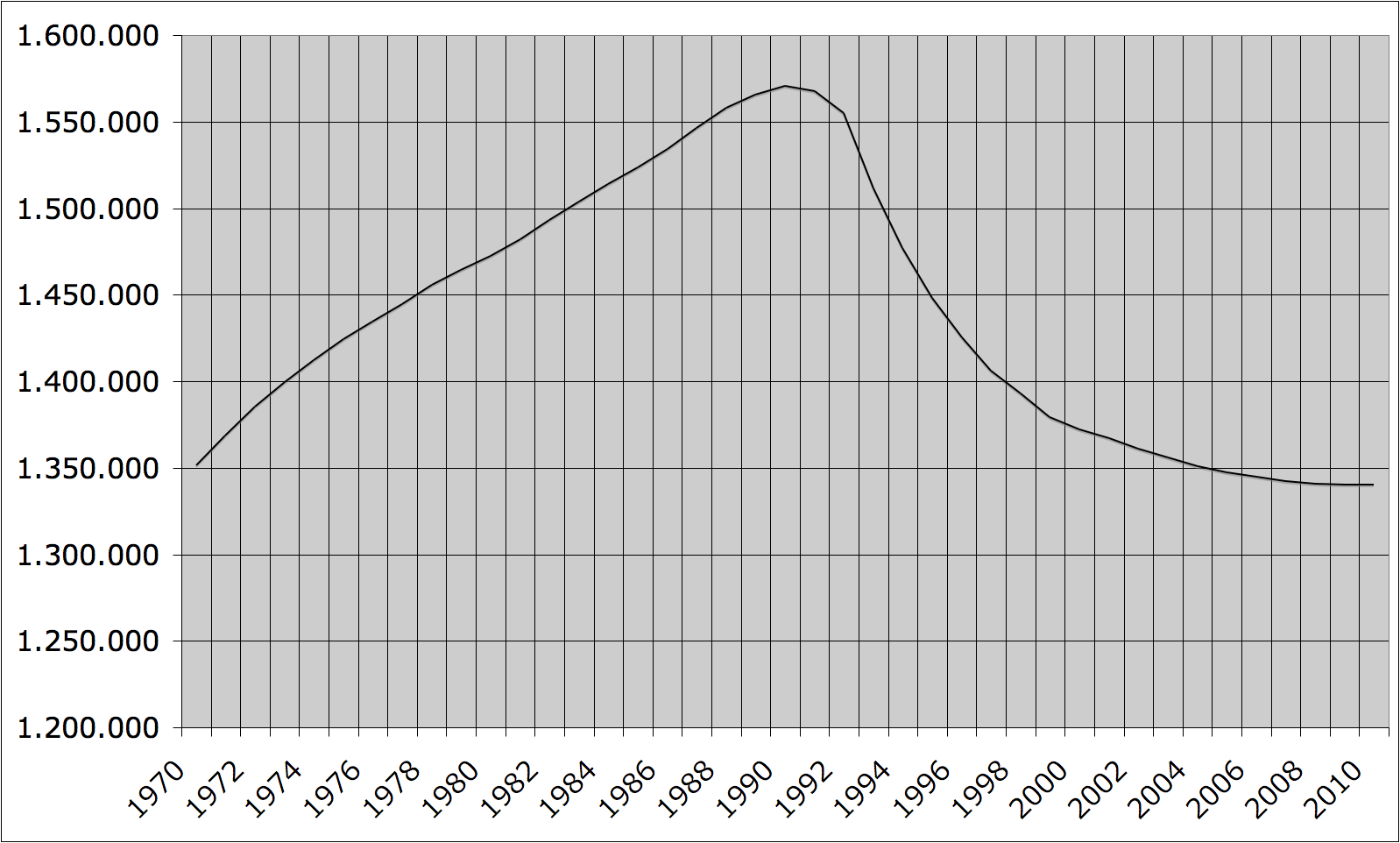
Population of Estonia (1970–2010). Data by Statistics Estonia (2010).

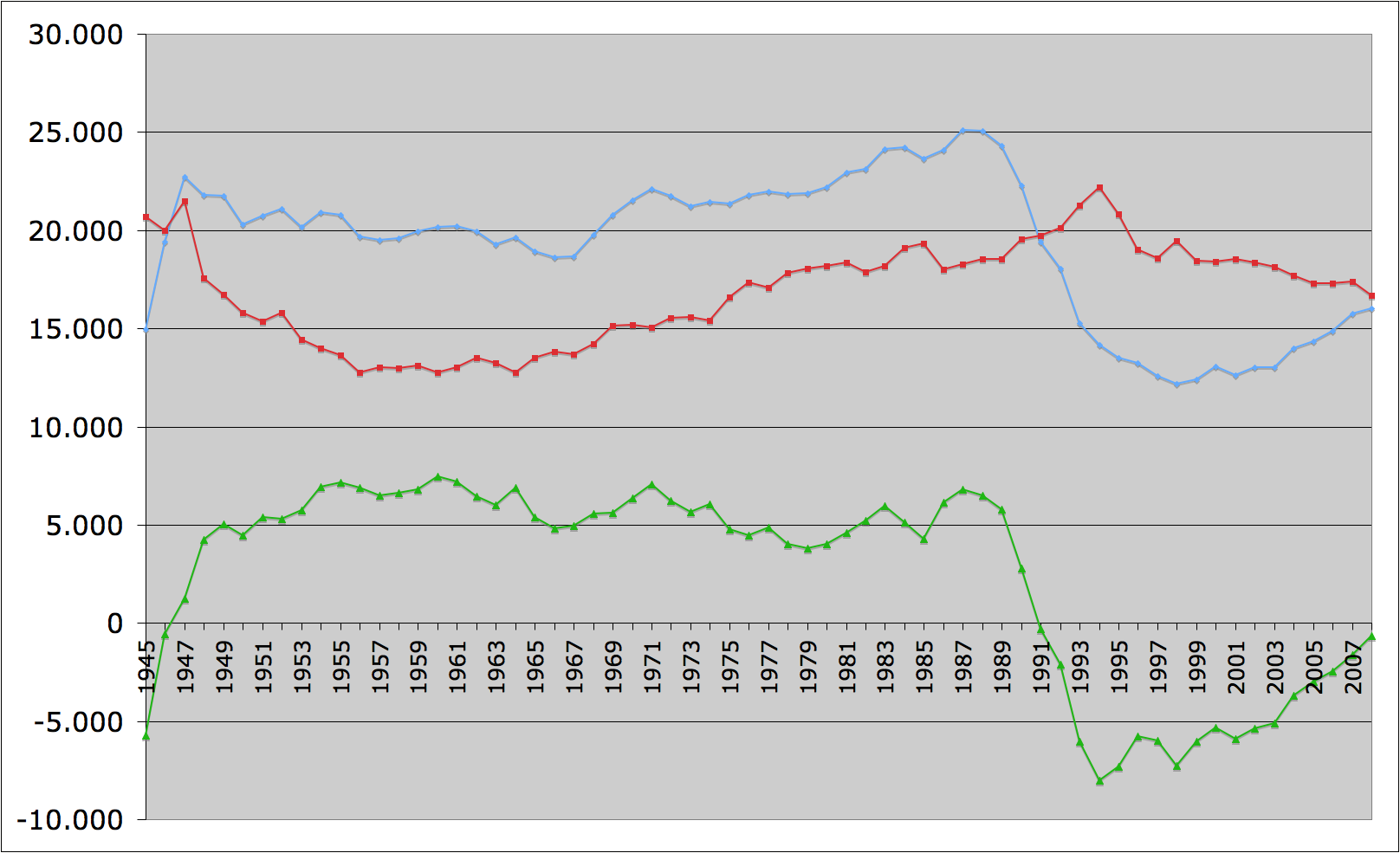
Natural population increase of Estonia from 1945–2008. Data is taken from Statistics Estonia.
- Number of births
- Number of deaths
- Natural population increase

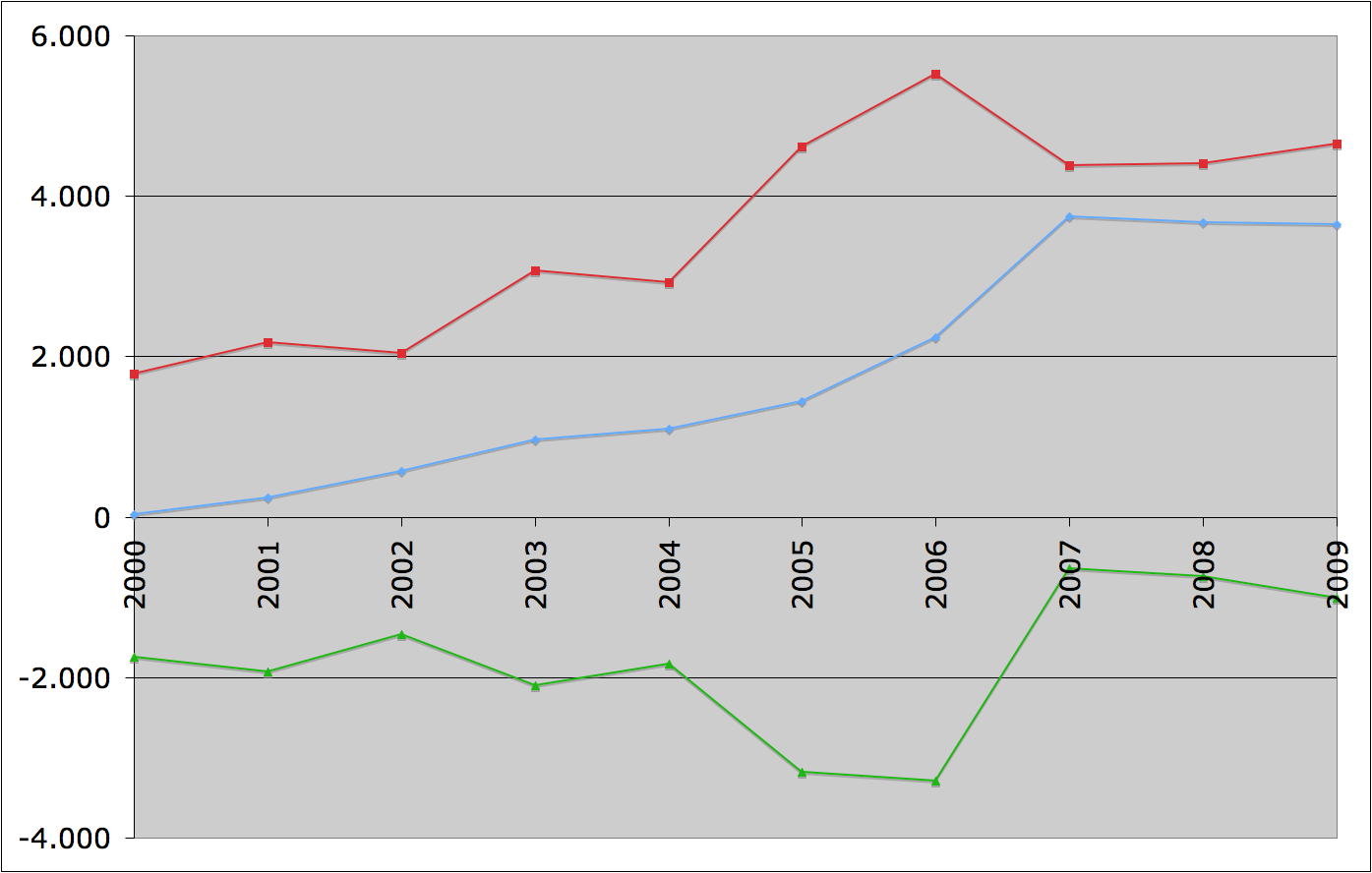
External migration of Estonia from 2000–2009. Data is taken from Statistics Estonia.
- Number of immigrants
- Number of emigrants
- Total external migration

According to the data of Statistics Estonia, on 1 January 2026, the population of Estonia was 1,360,745 persons. On 1 January 2025 the population of Estonia was 1,369,995 persons, on 1 January 2024 1,374,687 persons and on 1 January 2023 Estonia had a population of 1,365,884.

The population increased from 1,351,640 in January 1970 to 1,570,599 in January 1990. After 1990, Estonia lost about 15% of its population (230,000 people). The population decreased to 1,294,455 by December 2011, a figure lower than that recorded in 1970.

- 1,331,824 (2021 Population and Housing Census)
- 1,294,455 (2011 Population Count and Housing Census)
- 1,370,052 (2000 Population Count and Housing Census)

Decreasing population pressures are explained by a higher death than birth rate and periods of an excess of emigrants over immigrants.

Since 2015 the country has experienced population growth. The population mainly increased as a result of net immigration of European Union citizens. Citizens of Russia and Ukraine made up the bulk of non-EU immigration. The increase was detected through methodological changes in data collection. Initially a population decrease had been reported.

Census population and growth rate

Year	Pop.	±% p.a.
1881	881,455	—
1897	958,351	+0.52%
1922	1,107,059	+0.58%
1934	1,126,413	+0.14%
1941	1,017,475	−1.44%
1959	1,196,791	+0.91%
1970	1,356,079	+1.14%

Year	Pop.	±% p.a.
1979	1,464,476	+0.86%
1989	1,565,662	+0.67%
2000	1,370,052	−1.21%
2011	1,294,455	−0.51%
2021	1,331,824	+0.29%
2026	1,360,745	+0.43%

View source data.
View source data.
View source data.
View source data.

=== Structure of the population ===
Population Estimates by Sex and Age Group (01.I.2021):

Age group	Male	Female	Total	%
Total	630 081	699 398	1 329 479	100
0–4	36 496	34 282	70 778	5.32
5–9	36 943	35 192	72 135	5.43
10–14	38 862	36 812	75 674	5.69
15–19	32 557	31 056	63 613	4.78
20–24	32 304	30 481	62 785	4.72
25–29	41 090	37 598	78 688	5.92
30–34	53 536	47 937	101 473	7.63
35–39	49 887	46 058	95 945	7.22
40–44	47 106	44 160	91 266	6.86
45–49	46 552	45 084	91 636	6.89
50–54	41 680	42 995	84 675	6.37
55–59	41 167	45 436	86 603	6.51
60–64	38 495	47 293	85 788	6.45
65–69	32 536	45 680	78 216	5.88
70–74	24 568	39 996	64 564	4.86
75–79	16 040	31 412	47 452	3.57
80–84	12 326	30 478	42 804	3.22
85–89	5 683	17 620	23 303	1.75
90–94	1 960	7 968	9 928	0.75
95–99	278	1 724	2 002	0.15
100+	15	136	151	0.01
Age group	Male	Female	Total	Percent
0–14	112 301	106 286	218 587	16.44
15–64	424 374	418 098	842 472	63.37
65+	93 406	175 014	268 420	20.19

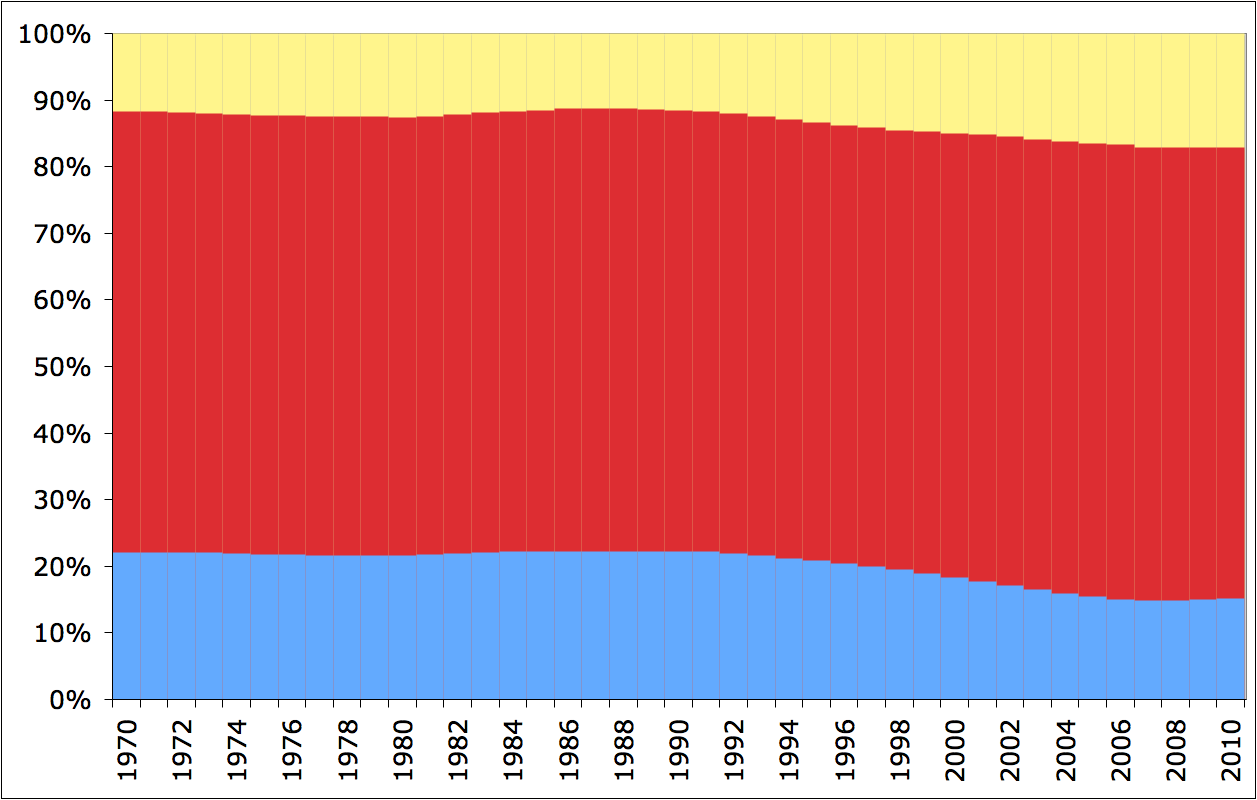
Age structure of Estonia from 1970 to 2010. Data is taken from Statistics Estonia. Age: 0–14 Age: 15–64 Age: 65+

Between 1970 and 1990 the age structure of Estonia was rather stable with around 22% of the population in the age group 0–14 years, 66% between 15 and 65, while 12% were 65 years or older. Due to the low birth rates after 1990, the proportion of the population 0–14 years of age dropped to 15% in 2009, while the proportion of 65 years or older gradually increased to 17% in 2009. The proportion of the age group 15–64 also slightly increased to 68% in 2009.

== Vital statistics ==
Births and deaths in Estonia over time

Live births and deaths over time

Crude birth rate and death rate over time

Marriages and divorces in Estonia over time

=== Vital statistics for the Governorate of Estonia ===
The Governorate of Estonia comprised the northern part of present-day Estonia. The southern part was part of the Governorate of Livonia.

	Average population	Live births	Deaths	Natural change	Crude birth rate (per 1000)	Crude death rate (per 1000)	Natural change (per 1000)
1900	428,000	12,487	8,227	4,260	29.2	19.2	10.0
1901	430,000	12,703	8,428	4,275	29.5	19.6	9.9
1902	434,000	13,101	7,724	5,377	30.2	17.8	12.4
1903	440,000	12,704	8,004	4,700	28.9	18.2	10.7
1904	446,000	12,753	8,279	4,474	28.6	18.6	10.0
1905	449,000	11,991	9,694	2,297	26.7	21.6	5.1
1906	452,000	12,417	8,842	3,575	27.4	19.5	7.9
1907	455,000	12,304	8,730	3,574	27.0	19.2	7.9
1908	459,000	11,861	8,495	3,366	25.8	18.5	7.3
1909	464,000	11,970	8,297	3,673	25.8	17.9	7.9
1910	466,000	12,193	8,204	3,989	26.2	17.6	8.6
1911	472,000	11,749	8,976	2,773	24.9	19.0	5.9
1912	480,000	11,900	8,431	3,469	24.8	17.6	7.2
1913	491,000	11,653	9,089	2,564	23.7	18.5	5.2
1914	506,000	11,854	9,212	2,642	23.4	18.2	5.2

=== Present Estonia ===
Source: Statistics Estonia

Live births by age group in Estonia

From 1947 to 1989 the number of births was higher than the number of deaths, but from 1990 onwards the number of deaths outnumbered the number of births. The crude birth rate of 2011 was 10.96 (14,679 births) and the crude death rate of 2011 was 11.38 (15,244 deaths), making the rate of natural increase −0.42 (−565). For more detailed historic data, see the table below.

Notable events in Estonian demographics:

- 1914–1918 – World War I
- 1918–1920 – War of Independence
- 1940–1945 – World War II
- 1941–1953 – Soviet deportations
- 1991 – Dissolution of the Soviet Union

	Average population	Live births	Deaths	Natural change	Crude birth rate (per 1000)	Crude death rate (per 1000)	Natural change (per 1000)	Crude migration change (per 1000)	Total fertility rate	Infant mortality rate
1914	1,197,000	26,865	20,882	5,983	22.4	17.4	5.0	−12.5		
1915	1,188,000	24,680	21,841	2,839	20.8	18.4	2.4	−31.9		
1916	1,154,000	21,282	25,429	−4,147	18.4	22.0	−3.6	−25.9		
1917	1,120,000	18,333	27,336	−9,003	16.4	24.4	−8.0	−22.4		
1918	1,086,000	21,659	32,488	−10,829	19.9	29.9	−10.0	−10.3		
1919	1,064,000	18,456	28,800	−10,344	17.3	27.1	−9.7	13.5		
1920	1,068,000	19,625	21,363	−1,738	18.4	20.0	−1.6	19.4		
1921	1,087,000	22,067	17,143	4,924	20.3	15.8	4.5	9.3		
1922	1,102,000	22,255	18,401	3,854	20.2	16.7	3.5	4.7		
1923	1,111,000	22,347	16,630	5,717	20.1	15.0	5.1	−0.6		
1924	1,116,000	21,441	16,918	4,523	19.2	15.2	4.1	−3.2		99.9
1925	1,117,000	20,445	16,680	3,765	18.3	14.9	3.4	−3.4		95.7
1926	1,117,000	19,977	18,047	1,900	17.9	16.2	1.7	−2.6		101.8
1927	1,116,000	19,705	19,356	500	17.7	17.3	0.4	−0.4		114.6
1928	1,116,000	20,064	17,785	2,279	18.0	15.9	2.0	−2.0		103.6
1929	1,116,000	19,110	20,178	−1,068	17.1	18.1	1.0	1.0		110.5
1930	1,116,000	19,471	16,610	2,861	17.4	14.9	2.6	−0.8		100.1
1931	1,118,000	19,509	18,077	1,432	17.4	16.2	1.3	2.3		102.8
1932	1,122,000	19,742	16,641	3,101	17.6	14.8	2.8	−1.0		96.8
1933	1,124,000	18,208	16,472	1,736	16.2	14.7	1.5	0.3		94.0
1934	1,126,000	17,305	15,853	1,452	15.4	14.1	1.3	1.4		91.1
1935	1,129,000	17,891	16,864	1,027	15.8	14.9	0.9	0		89.3
1936	1,130,000	18,222	17,594	628	16.1	15.6	0.6	0.3		89.2
1937	1,131,000	18,190	16,614	1,576	16.1	14.7	1.4	0.4		90.7
1938	1,133,000	18,453	16,496	1,957	16.3	14.6	1.7	−6.1		77.5
1939	1,128,000	18,475	17,101	1,374	16.4	15.2	1.2	−29.6		78.8
1940	1,096,000	18,407	19,024	−617	16.8	17.4	−0.6	−46.8		83.7
1941	1,044,000	19,574	23,702	−4,128	18.8	22.7	−4.0	−21.9		
1942	1,017,000	19,242	20,276	−1,034	18.9	19.9	−1.0	−9.8		91.8
1943	1,006,000	16,001	18,120	−2,119	15.9	18.0	−2.1	−13.8		
1944	990,000	15,180	24,700	−9,520	15.3	24.9	−9.6	−102.5		
1945	879,000	14,968	20,708	−5,740	17.0	23.6	−6.5	62.2		124.8
1946	928,000	19,408	19,969	−561	20.9	21.5	−0.6	53.4		96.8
1947	977,000	22,721	21,492	1,229	23.3	22.0	1.3	48.9		121.4
1948	1,026,000	21,777	17,549	4,228	21.2	17.1	4.1	42.7		84.2
1949	1,074,000	21,770	16,730	5,040	20.3	15.6	4.7	20.4		82.4
1950	1,101,000	20,279	15,817	4,462	18.4	14.4	4.1	7.7		81.2
1951	1,114,000	20,730	15,354	5,376	18.6	13.7	4.8	6.0		76.2
1952	1,126,000	21,111	15,817	5,294	18.7	14.0	4.7	8.0		64.9
1953	1,138,000	20,146	14,420	5,726	17.7	12.7	5.0	4.7		52.2
1954	1,149,000	20,909	13,981	6,928	18.2	12.2	6.0	3.6		49.5
1955	1,160,000	20,786	13,638	7,148	17.9	11.8	6.2	3.3		51.6
1956	1,171,000	19,660	12,748	6,912	16.8	10.9	5.9	2.6		41.2
1957	1,181,000	19,509	13,026	6,483	16.5	11.0	5.5	3.8		40.1
1958	1,192,000	19,598	12,971	6,627	16.4	10.9	5.6	3.6		39.9
1959	1,203,000	19,938	13,130	6,808	16.5	10.9	5.7	5.1		31.7
1960	1,216,000	20,187	12,738	7,449	16.6	10.5	6.1	4.6	1.95	31.1
1961	1,229,000	20,230	13,036	7,194	16.5	10.6	5.9	5.5	1.97	28.0
1962	1,243,000	19,959	13,495	6,464	16.1	10.9	5.2	6.9	1.95	25.2
1963	1,258,000	19,275	13,251	6,024	15.3	10.5	4.8	9.5	1.91	26.0
1964	1,276,000	19,629	12,754	6,875	15.4	10.0	5.4	6.4	1.94	25.4
1965	1,291,000	18,909	13,520	5,389	14.6	10.5	4.2	5.1	1.90	20.3
1966	1,303,000	18,629	13,800	4,829	14.3	10.6	3.7	4.7	1.85	20.0
1967	1,314,000	18,671	13,699	4,972	14.2	10.4	3.8	6.1	1.86	19.2
1968	1,327,000	19,782	14,225	5,557	14.9	10.7	4.2	9.4	2.03	18.0
1969	1,345,000	20,781	15,150	5,631	15.5	11.3	4.2	7.0	2.11	16.7
1970	1,360,000	21,552	15,186	6,366	15.8	11.2	4.7	7.8	2.16	17.7
1971	1,377,000	22,118	15,038	7,080	16.1	10.9	5.1	6.5	2.19	17.5
1972	1,393,000	21,757	15,520	6,237	15.6	11.1	4.5	4.8	2.14	15.9
1973	1,406,000	21,239	15,573	5,666	15.1	11.1	4.0	4.5	2.07	15.9
1974	1,418,000	21,461	15,393	6,068	15.1	10.9	4.3	3.5	2.07	17.6
1975	1,429,000	21,360	16,572	4,788	14.9	11.6	3.4	4.3	2.04	18.2
1976	1,440,000	21,801	17,351	4,450	15.1	12.0	3.1	3.8	2.06	17.5
1977	1,450,000	21,977	17,094	4,883	15.2	11.8	3.4	3.5	2.06	17.5
1978	1,460,000	21,842	17,812	4,030	15.0	12.2	2.8	2.7	2.02	16.5
1979	1,468,000	21,879	18,062	3,817	14.9	12.3	2.6	3.5	2.01	18.3
1980	1,477,000	22,204	18,199	4,005	15.0	12.3	2.7	4.7	2.02	17.1
1981	1,488,000	22,937	18,349	4,588	15.4	12.3	3.1	3.6	2.07	17.0
1982	1,498,000	23,128	17,893	5,235	15.4	11.9	3.5	3.8	2.08	17.2
1983	1,509,000	24,155	18,190	5,965	16.0	12.1	4.0	2.6	2.16	16.1
1984	1,519,000	24,234	19,086	5,148	16.0	12.6	3.4	3.2	2.17	13.6
1985	1,529,000	23,630	19,343	4,287	15.5	12.7	2.8	4.4	2.12	14.1
1986	1,540,000	24,106	17,986	6,120	15.7	11.7	4.0	3.8	2.17	15.9
1987	1,552,000	25,086	18,279	6,807	16.2	11.8	4.4	2.0	2.26	16.0
1988	1,562,000	25,060	18,551	6,509	16.0	11.9	4.2	−0.4	2.26	12.4
1989	1,568,000	24,318	18,536	5,762	15.5	11.8	3.7	−3.1	2.22	14.8
1990	1,569,000	22,304	19,531	2,778	14.2	12.4	1.8	−6.9	2.05	12.3
1991	1,561,000	19,413	19,715	−302	12.4	12.6	−0.2	−17.7	1.80	13.3
1992	1,533,000	18,038	20,126	−2,088	11.8	13.1	−1.4	−24.0	1.71	15.7
1993	1,494,000	15,253	21,286	−6,033	10.2	14.2	−4.0	−16.7	1.49	15.6
1994	1,463,000	14,176	22,212	−8,036	9.7	15.2	−5.5	−12.3	1.42	14.4
1995	1,437,000	13,509	20,828	−7,319	9.4	14.5	−5.1	−9.5	1.38	14.9
1996	1,416,000	13,242	19,020	−5,778	9.4	13.4	−4.1	−7.2	1.37	10.5
1997	1,400,000	12,577	18,572	−5,995	9.0	13.3	−4.3	−5.7	1.32	10.0
1998	1,386,000	12,167	19,445	−7,278	8.8	14.0	−5.3	−1.9	1.28	9.4
1999	1,376,000	12,425	18,447	−6,022	9.0	13.4	−4.4	19.7	1.32	9.6
2000	1,397,000	13,067	18,403	−5,336	9.4	13.2	−3.8	−2.6	1.35	8.4
2001	1,388,000	12,632	18,516	−5,884	9.1	13.2	−4.2	−2.3	1.31	8.8
2002	1,379,000	13,001	18,355	−5,354	9.4	13.3	−3.9	−1.9	1.36	5.7
2003	1,371,000	13,036	18,152	−5,116	9.5	13.2	−3.7	−2.1	1.36	7.0
2004	1,363,000	13,992	17,685	−3,693	10.3	13.0	−2.7	−3.2	1.47	6.4
2005	1,355,000	14,350	17,316	−2,966	10.6	12.8	−2.2	−3.7	1.52	5.4
2006	1,347,000	14,877	17,316	−2,439	11.0	12.9	−1.8	−2.7	1.58	4.4
2007	1,341,000	15,775	17,409	−1,634	11.8	13.0	−1.2	−1.8	1.69	5.0
2008	1,337,000	16,028	16,675	−647	12.0	12.5	−0.5	−1.0	1.72	5.0
2009	1,335,000	15,763	16,081	−318	11.8	12.1	−0.2	−2.0	1.70	3.6
2010	1,332,000	15,825	15,790	35	11.9	11.9	0.0	−3.8	1.72	3.3
2011	1,327,000	14,679	15,244	−565	11.0	11.4	−0.4	−2.6	1.61	2.5
2012	1,323,000	14,056	15,450	−1,394	10.6	11.7	−1.1	−2.7	1.56	3.6
2013	1,318,000	13,531	15,244	−1,713	10.3	11.6	−1.3	−1.7	1.52	2.1
2014	1,314,000	13,551	15,484	−1,933	10.3	11.8	−1.5	1.5	1.54	2.7
2015	1,314,000	13,907	15,243	−1,336	10.6	11.6	−1.0	2.5	1.58	2.5
2016	1,316,000	14,053	15,392	−1,339	10.7	11.7	−1.0	1.8	1.60	2.3
2017	1,317,000	13,784	15,543	−1,759	10.5	11.8	−1.3	5.1	1.59	2.3
2018	1,322,000	14,367	15,751	−1,384	10.9	11.9	−1.0	4.8	1.67	1.6
2019	1,327,000	14,099	15,401	−1,302	10.6	11.6	−1.0	2.5	1.66	1.6
2020	1,329,000	13,209	15,811	−2,602	9.9	11.9	−2.0	3.5	1.58	1.4
2021	1,331,000	13,272	18,587	−5,315	10.0	14.0	−4.0	17.5	1.61	2.2
2022	1,349,000	11,646	17,315	−5,669	8.6	12.8	−4.2	19.8	1.41	2.2
2023	1,370,000	10,949	16,002	−5,053	8.0	11.7	−3.7	19.2	1.31	1.7
2024	1,372,000	9,690	15,756	−6,066	7.1	11.5	−4.4	5.8	1.18	1.5
2025	1,365,400	9,240	15,688	−6,448	6.8	11.5	−4.7	1.2	1.16	1.3
2026	1,360,700	8,700(e)							1.10 (e)	

According to Statistics Estonia, on 1 January 2026, the population of Estonia stood at 1,360,745. This is 9,250 persons fewer than at the same time the year before. Estonia's population decreased for the second year in a row. There were 9,240 births and 15,688 deaths last year – natural increase was negative -6,448 persons. Net migration was negative after several years – 15,212 persons immigrated to Estonia and 18,014 persons emigrated (−2,802 people).

Year earlier, on 1 January 2025, the population of Estonia was 1,369,995. This was 4,692 persons less than year ago. There were 9,690 births and 15,756 deaths in Estonia last year. 18,634 persons immigrated to Estonia and 17,260 persons emigrated in 2024 – natural increase was negative (−6,066), while net migration was positive (+1,374).

On 1 January 2024 1,374,687 persons lived in Estonia. In 2023 natural increase was negative (−5,053 people), while net migration was positive (+13,856 people, 26,399 persons immigrated to Estonia and 12,543 persons emigrated from Estonia). On 1 January 2023 1,365,884 persons lived in Estonia, on 1 January 2022 lived in Estonia 1,331,796 persons and on 1 January 2021 1,330,068 persons.

=== Current vital statistics ===
The data is based on registrations of births and deaths.

Period	Live births	Deaths	Natural increase
January–October 2025	7,721	12,797	–5,076
January–October 2026	7,238	12,421	–5,183
Difference	▼ –483 (−6.26%)	▼ –376 (−2.94%)	▼ –107

View source data.

=== Total fertility rate ===
Between 1970 and 1990, the total fertility rate (TFR) was little over 2 children born per woman. A fast decrease of the TFR occurred after independence. In 1998 the lowest rate was recorded: 1.28 children born per woman. The TFR slightly recovered in the subsequent years. The TFR was 1.66 in 2008 and 1.52 in 2011.

Years	1875	1876	1877	1878	1879
Total Fertility Rate in Estonia	4.40	4.35	4.29	4.23	4.20

Years	1880	1881	1882	1883	1884	1885	1886	1887	1888	1889
Total Fertility Rate in Estonia	4.16	4.13	4.10	4.06	4.04	4.01	3.99	3.96	3.94	3.90

Years	1890	1891	1892	1893	1894	1895	1896	1897	1898	1899
Total Fertility Rate in Estonia	3.87	3.84	3.80	3.77	3.79	3.82	3.85	3.88	3.91	3.89

Years	1900	1901	1902	1903	1904	1905	1906	1907	1908	1909
Total Fertility Rate in Estonia	3.88	3.86	3.84	3.82	3.76	3.70	3.63	3.57	3.51	3.47

Years	1910	1911	1912	1913
Total Fertility Rate in Estonia	3.43	3.38	3.34	3.30

=== Infant mortality rate ===
The infant mortality rate in Estonia has decreased considerably during the past decades. In 1970 the rate was 17.7 per 1,000 live births. The rate decreased to 17.1 in 1980, 12.3 in 1990 and 8.4 in 2000. The lowest infant mortality rate was recorded in 2011: 2.6.

=== Life expectancy at birth ===
Development of life expectancy in Estonia

Life expectancy in Estonia is lower than in most Western European countries. During the Soviet era life expectancy in males was between 64 and 66 years and in females between 73 and 75 years. After the independence, life expectancy decreased for a number of years. In 1994, the lowest life expectancy was recorded: 60.5 years in males and 72.8 in females. After 1994, in 30 years, life expectancy gradually increased to reach 75.1 years in males and 84.4 in females in 2024.

Period	Life expectancy in Years
1950–1955	61.77
1955–1960	▲66.92
1960–1965	▲69.38
1965–1970	▲70.31
1970–1975	▼70.27
1975–1980	▼69.43
1980–1985	▼69.32
1985–1990	▲70.34
1991–1995	▼68.11
1996–2000	▲70.17
2001–2005	▲71.97
2006–2010	▲74.36
2011–2015	▲77.00
2016–2020	▲78.39
2021–2024	▲78.44
2024	▲79.46
2025	▲79.80

By data from Statistics Estonia, life expectancy at birth in 2025 was 75.6 years for males and 83.6 years for females, on average for all 79.8 years. In 1994, the life expectancy of Estonian residents was 66.5 years, whereas by 2024 it had increased by 13 years and reached 79.5 years. 2025 data show than Estonian residents have 57.3 (2024: 58.7) healthy life years at birth. Men live disability-free for 55.2 (56.8) years and women for 59.3 (60.6) years.

For comparison, life expectancy in Estonia is still below the European average, which was 81.5 years in 2024.

== Ethnic groups ==
Population of Estonia by ethnic groups 2022–2025

Ethnic group	2022		2023		2024		2025		2026	
Ethnic group	Number	%	Number	%	Number	%	Number	%	Number	%
Estonians	919,693	69.06%	925,892	67.79%	931,993	67.80%	931,124	68.23%	932,603	68.50%
Russians	315,242	23.67%	306,801	22.46%	296,268	21.55%	285,736	20.86%	276,125	20.20%
Ukrainians	27,826	2.09%	55,675	4.08%	68,770	5.00%	75,043	5.37%	75,250	5.50%
Belarusians	11,605	0.87%	11,562	0.85%	11,402	0.83%	11,844	0.81%	11,477	0.83%
Finns	8,543	0.64%	8,518	0.62%	8,344	0.61%	8,080	0.59%	8,059	0.61%
Latvians	3,827	0.29%	4,094	0.30%	4,232	0.31%	4,225	0.31%	4,272	0.31%
Germans	2,701	0.20%	2,900	0.21%	2,923	0.21%	2,954	0.22%	2,983	0.21%
Lithuanians	2,097	0.16%	2,146	0.16%	2,146	0.16%	2,095	0.15%	2,100	0.16%
Tatars	1,938	0.15%	1,984	0.15%	2,022	0.15%	2,023	0.15%	2,148	0.15%
Jews	1,852	0.14%	1,939	0.14%	2,013	0.14%	2,012	0.15%	1,951	0.14%
Poles	1,845	0.14%	1,915	0.14%	1,882	0.14%	1,883	0.14%	1,928	0.14%
Armenians	1,666	0.13%	1,755	0.13%	1,804	0.13%	1,852	0.14%	1,889	0.13%
Azerbaijanis	1,546	0.12%	1,688	0.12%	1,775	0.13%	1,837	0.13%	1,975	0.13%
Other ethnic nationalities	24,703	1.85%	28,237	2.07%	30,433	2.21%	31,626	2.31%	24,703	1.85%
Ethnic nationality unknown	6,712	0.50%	10,778	0.79%	8,680	0.63%	6,178	0.45%	5,398	0.63%
Total	1,331,796		1,365,884		1,374,687		1,369,995		1,360,745	

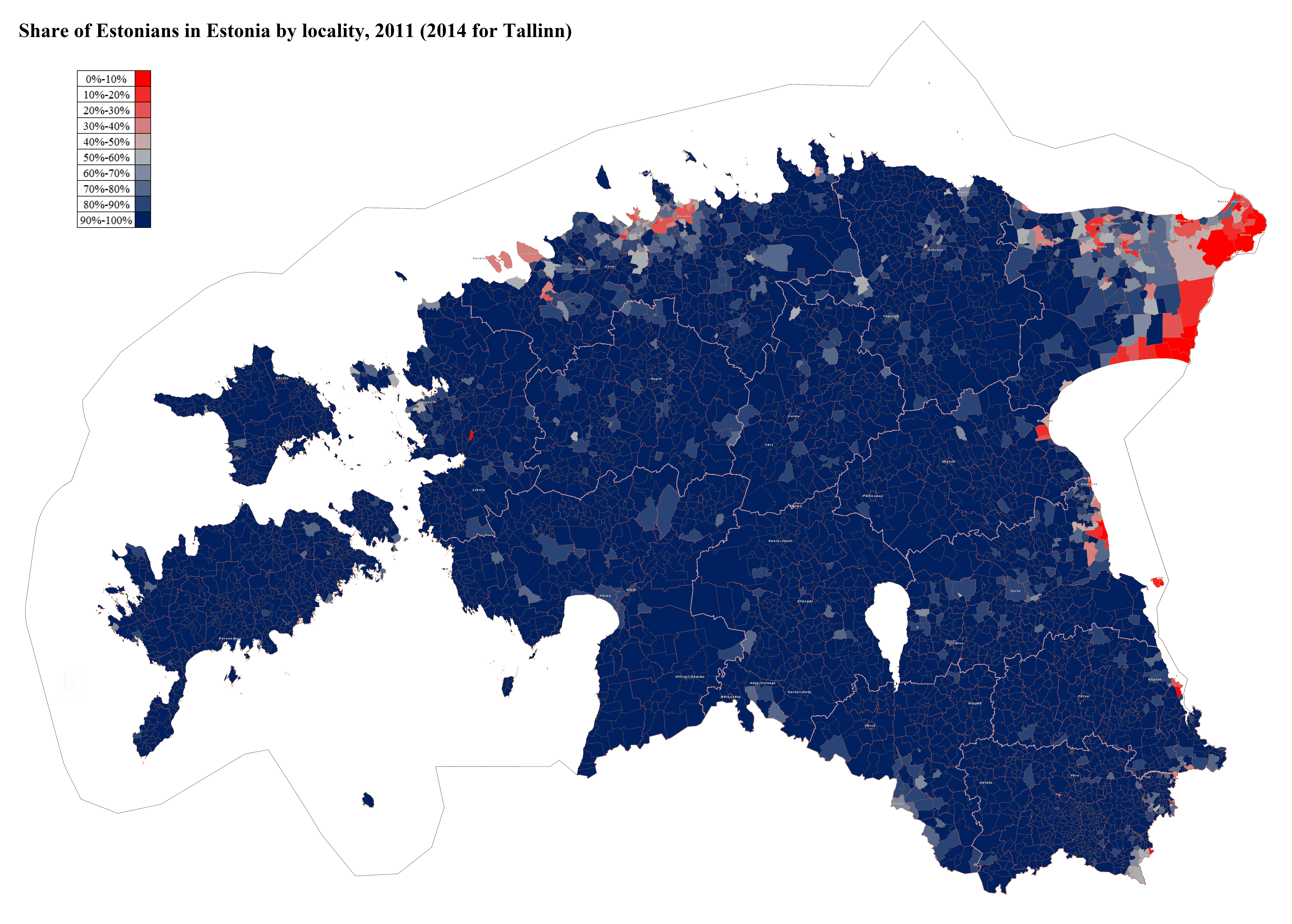
Share of ethnic Estonians by Estonian locality

Today, Estonia is an ethnically fairly diverse country, ranking 97th out of 239 countries and territories in 2001 study by Kok Kheng Yeoh. In 2008, thirteen of Estonia's fifteen counties were over 80% ethnic Estonian. The counties with the highest percentage Estonians are Hiiu County (98.4%) and Saare County (98.3%). However, in Harju County (which includes the national capital, Tallinn) and Ida-Viru County, ethnic Estonians make up only 59.6% (55.0% in Tallinn) and 19.7% of the population, respectively. In those two counties, Russians account for 32.4% (36.4% in Tallinn) and 71.2% of the population, respectively. In the nation as a whole, Russians make up 23% of the total population.

After gaining independence following World War I a population census was held in 1922 and 1934. At that time Estonians were still the predominant ethnic group, while all others constituted 12% of the population of Estonia.

Major Jewish communities were present in Estonia between 1918 and 1940 in Tallinn, Pärnu, Kilingi-Nõmme, Narva, Tartu, Valga, and Võru.

Population of Estonia by ethnic group 1897–2021

Ethnic group	census 1897		census 1922^{1}		census 1934^{1}		census 1959^{2}		census 1970^{3}		census 1979^{4}		census 1989^{5}		census 2000^{6}		census 2011		census 2021	
Ethnic group	Number	%	Number	%	Number	%	Number	%	Number	%	Number	%	Number	%	Number	%	Number	%	Number	%
Estonians	867,794	90.6	969,976	87.6	992,520	88.1	892,653	74.6	925,157	68.2	947,812	64.7	963,281	61.5	930,219	67.9	902,547	69.7	919,711	69.1
Russians	37,599	3.9	91,109	8.2	92,656	8.2	240,227	20.1	334,620	24.7	408,778	27.9	474,834	30.3	351,178	25.6	326,235	25.2	315,252	23.6
Ukrainians	504	0.1	—		92	0.0	15,769	1.3	28,086	2.1	36,044	2.5	48,271	3.1	29,012	2.1	22,573	1.7	27,828	2.1
Belarusians	272	0.0	—		—		10,930	0.9	18,732	1.4	23,461	1.6	27,711	1.8	17,241	1.3	12,579	1.0	11,606	0.9
Finns	362	0.0	401	0.0	1,088	0.1	16,699	1.4	18,537	1.4	17,753	1.2	16,622	1.1	11,837	0.9	7,589	0.6	8,543	0.6
Latvians	5,470	0.6	1,966	0.2	5,435	0.5	2,888	0.2	3,286	0.2	3,963	0.3	3,135	0.2	2,330	0.2	1,764	0.1	3,827	0.3
Germans	33,362	3.5	18,319	1.7	16,346	1.5	670	0.1	7,850	0.6	3,944	0.3	3,466	0.2	1,870	0.1	1,544	0.1	2,701	0.2
Lithuanians	44	0.0	436	0.0	253	0.0	1,616	0.1	2,356	0.2	2,379	0.2	2,568	0.2	2,116	0.2	1,727	0.1	2,097	0.2
Tatars	36	0.0	—		166	0.0	1,534	0.1	2,204	0.2	3,195	0.2	4,058	0.3	2,582	0.2	1,993	0.2	1,938	0.1
Jews	3,837	0.4	4,566	0.4	4,434	0.4	5,433	0.5	5,282	0.4	4,954	0.3	4,613	0.3	2,145	0.2	1,973	0.2	1,852	0.1
Poles	1,941	0.2	969	0.1	1,608	0.1	2,256	0.2	2,651	0.2	2,897	0.2	3,008	0.2	2,193	0.2	1,664	0.1	1,845	0.1
Swedes	6,083	0.6	7,850	0.7	7,641	0.7	—		435	0.0	254	0.0	297	0.0	300	0.0	380	0.0	811	
Armenians	—		—		—		—		—		—		—		—		1,428	0.1	1,666	0.1
Azerbaijanis	—		—		—		—		—		—		—		—		940	0.0	1,546	0.1
French people	—		—		—		—		—		—		—		—		117	0.0	1,275	0.0
Italians	—		—		—		—		—		—		—		—		230	0.0	1,181	0.0
Hindus	—		—		—		—		—		—		—		—		90	0.0	1,165	0.0
Englishmen	—		—		—		—		—		—		—		—		270	0.0	999	0.0
Georgians	—		—		—		—		—		—		—		—		490	0.0	946	0.0
Spaniards	—		—		—		—		—		—		—		—		100	0.0	767	0.0
Turkish people	—		—		—		—		—		—		—		—		86	0.0	763	0.0
Moldavians	—		—		—		—		—		—		—		—		511	0.0	730	0.0
Romani people	—		—		—		—		—		—		—		—		482	0.0	676	0.0
Americans	—		—		—		—		—		—		—		—		245	0.0	645	0.0
Pakistanis	—		—		—		—		—		—		—		—		27	0.0	560	0.0
Romanians	—		—		—		—		—		—		—		—		91	0.0	517	0.0
Arabs	—		—		—		—		—		—		—		—		80	0.0	489	0.0
Brazilians	—		—		—		—		—		—		—		—		29	0.0	460	0.0
Chinese	—		—		—		—		—		—		—		—		90	0.0	427	0.0
Persians	—		—		—		—		—		—		—		—		23	0.0	426	0.0
Other	1,047	0.1	11,467	1.0	4,266	0.4	6,116	0.5	6,883	0.5	9,042	0.6	13,798	0.9	19,174	1.4	7,538	0.6	18,575	1.4
Total	958,351		1,107,059		1,126,413		1,196,791		1,356,079		1,464,476		1,565,662		1,370,052		1,294,455		1,331,824	

As a result of the Soviet occupation from 1944 to 1991 and Soviet policies, the share of ethnic Estonians in the population resident within currently defined boundaries of Estonia dropped to 61.5% in 1989, compared to 88% in 1934 following large scale Russian migration which provoked fear that the Estonian majority would become a minority. But in the decade following the restoration of independence, large scale emigration by ethnic Russians, as well as ethnic groups of other former Soviet countries, and the removal of the Russian military bases in 1994, caused the proportion of ethnic Estonians in Estonia to increase from 61.5% in 1989 to 68.7% in 2008. In the same period the proportion of ethnic Russians decreased from 30.0% to 25.6%, the proportion of ethnic Ukrainians decreased from 3.1% to 2.1%, and the proportion of ethnic Belarusians decreased from 1.8% to 1.2%.

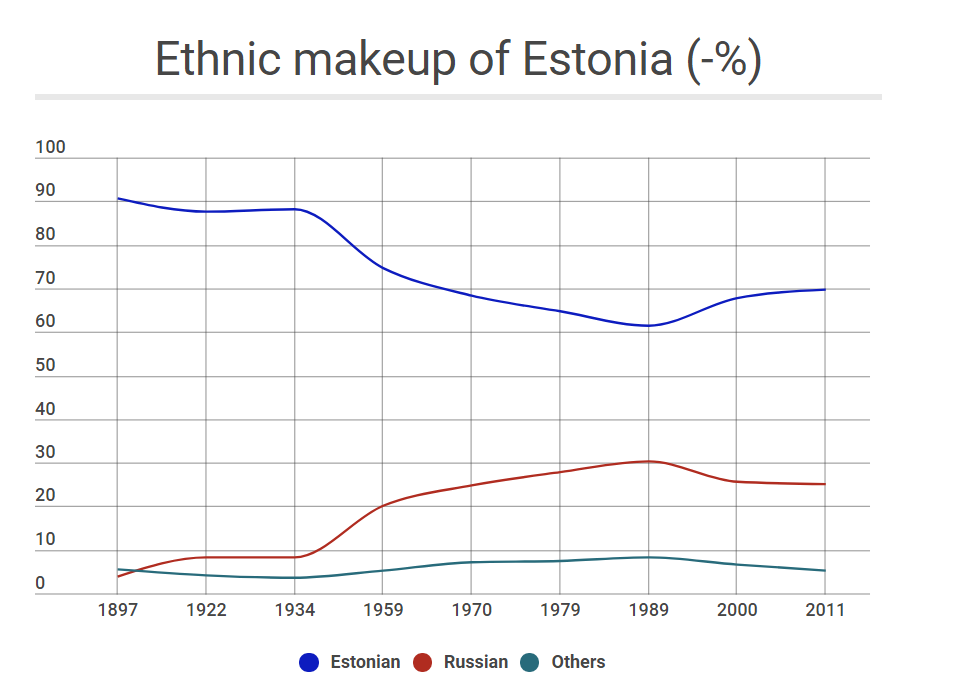
1897–2011 Estonia ethnic makeup

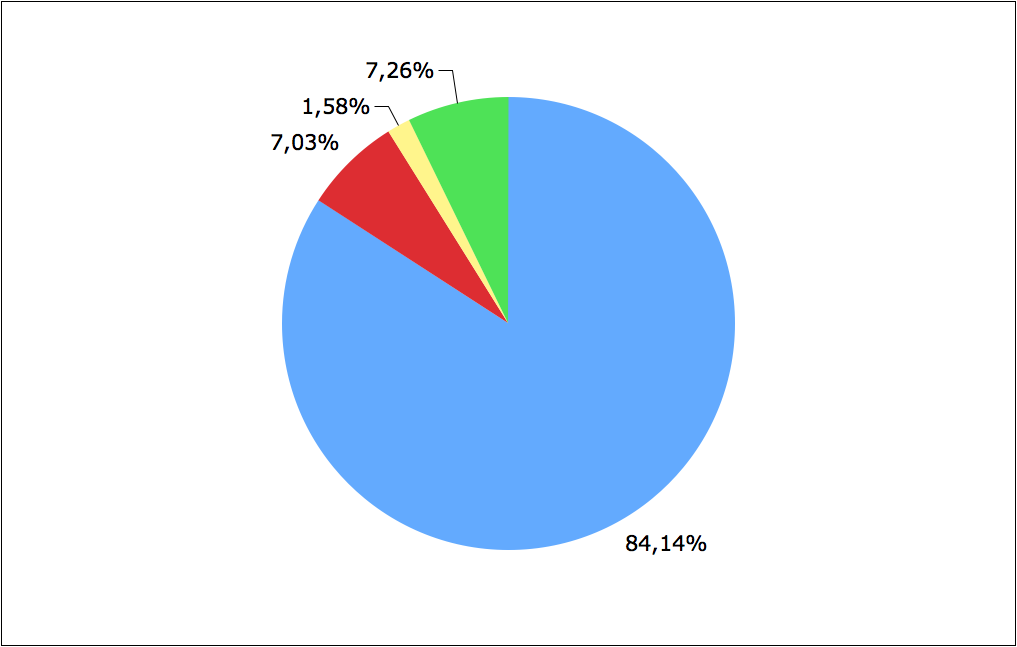
Citizenship of the population of Estonia in 2010. Data is taken from Statistics Estonia. Estonian: 1,148,895 Russian: 95,939 Others: 21,517 Undetermined: 99,173

In 2008, the largest ethnic groups in Estonia were Estonians 68.7%, Russians 25.6%, Ukrainians 2.1%, Belarusians 1.2%, and Finns 0.8%. These five groups made up 98.4% of Estonia's population.

The numbers had changed a little by the time of the 2021 census, when they were reported as Estonians 69.1%, Russians 23.6%, Ukrainians 2.1%, Belarusians 0.9%, and Finns 0.6%.

Population pyramids of ethnic groups within Estonia

Estonians

Russian

Newborns in Estonia according to ethnic group
Ethnicity	1989		1996		2001		2006		2011		2016		2021		2024	
Ethnicity	Number	%	Number	%	Number	%	Number	%	Number	%	Number	%	Number	%	Number	%
(Estonia) Estonian	15,701	64.6	9,607	72.5	8,867	70.2	10,678	71.8	10,809	73.6	9,973	71.0	10,077	75.9	7,045	72.7
(Russia) Russian	6,539	26.9	2,938	22.2	3,172	25.1	3,583	24.1	3,438	23.4	3,612	25.7	2,553	19.2	1,615	16.7
(Ukraine) Ukrainian	856	3.5	250	1.9	235	1.9	215	1.4	142	1.0	186	2.0	186	1.4	487	5.0
Other	1,222	5.0	447	3.4	358	2.8	401	2.7	290	2.0	282	1.3	456	3.4	543	5.6
Total	24,318		13,242		12,632		14,877		14,679		14,053		13,272		9,690	

== Immigration ==
As the cumulative negative natural growth was about 82,000 during 1991–2010, the remainder of the population decline of Estonia since 1990 (230,000 people in total) was caused by emigration (150,000 people or about 10% of the population of Estonia in 1990). Mainly ethnic Russians, Ukrainians and Belarusians emigrated. Consequently, the proportion of these ethnic groups decreased as can be seen in the results of the 2000 census (see below). Data from 2000 to 2009 also shows that the number of emigrants is larger than the number of immigrants, but on a much lower lever than in the 1990s.

=== Estonia migration data, 2014–present ===
Year	Immigration	Emigration	Net Migration
2014	3,904	4,637	−733
2015	15,413	13,003	2,410
2016	14,822	13,792	1,030
2017	17,616	12,358	5,258
2018	17,547	10,476	7,071
2019	18,172	12,801	5,371
2020	16,209	12,427	3,782
2021	19,524	12,481	7,043
2022	49,414	9,657	39,757
2023	26,399	12,543	13,856
2024	18,634	17,260	1,374
2025	15,212	18,014	−2,802

Foreign-born population by census in 2000, 2011 and 2021
Country of birth	2000		2011		2021	
Country of birth	Number	%	Number	%	Number	%
Russia	184,795	13.49%	134,948	10.43%	110,161	8.27%
Ukraine	25,185	1.84%	21,156	1.63%	28,621	2.15%
Belarus	14,883	1.09%	11,593	0.90%	10,326	0.78%
Latvia	4,326	0.32%	3,859	0.30%	6,375	0.48%
Finland	1,381	0.10%	2,173	0.17%	6,130	0.46%
Kazakhstan	3,841	0.28%	3,710	0.29%	3,802	0.29%
Germany	978	0.07%	1,240	0.10%	2,536	0.19%
Lithuania	2,101	0.15%	1,816	0.14%	2,014	0.15%
Azerbaijan	1,449	0.11%	1,450	0.11%	1,828	0.14%
Georgia	1,586	0.12%	1,449	0.11%	1,794	0.13%
United Kingdom	65	0.00%	475	0.04%	1,718	0.13%
Moldova	878	0.06%	801	0.06%	1,431	0.11%
France	89	0.01%	192	0.01%	1,315	0.10%
India	53	0.00%	101	0.01%	1,302	0.10%
United States	193	0.01%	565	0.04%	1,293	0.10%
Italy	27	0.00%	267	0.02%	1,188	0.09%
Uzbekistan	1,091	0.08%	1,064	0.08%	1,165	0.09%
Nigeria	5	0.00%	13	0.00%	1,030	0.08%
Other countries	14,096	1.03%	5,491	0.42%	17,236	1.29%
Foreign-born total	257,022	18.76%	192,363	14.86%	201,265	15.11%
Estonia	1,113,030	81.24%	1,102,092	85.14%	1,130,559	84.89%
Population total	1,370,052	100%	1,294,455	100%	1,331,824	100%

There were a total of 201,265 foreign-born people in Estonia at 31 December 2021, representing 15% of the population. 55% of them were born in Russia, and a total of 84% in a Post-Soviet countries.

In 2022, according to the data on registered migration (from the Population Register), 49,414 persons immigrated to Estonia and 9,657 persons emigrated from Estonia. Net migration was positive, 39,757 persons more staying than leaving Estonia. Both registered immigration and net migration were several times bigger than the average of recent years, due to the arrival of war refugees from Ukraine. Based on citizenship, the largest number of immigrants settling in Estonia had Ukrainian citizenship (33,217).

In 2021, the population of Estonia decreased by 5,315 persons due to negative natural increase and increased by 7,043 persons as a result of positive net migration – 19,524 persons immigrated to Estonia and 12,481 persons emigrated from Estonia (In 2020: 16,209 persons immigrated and 12,427 persons emigrated). The destination countries for migration were Finland, Ukraine and Russia in both directions.

== Languages ==
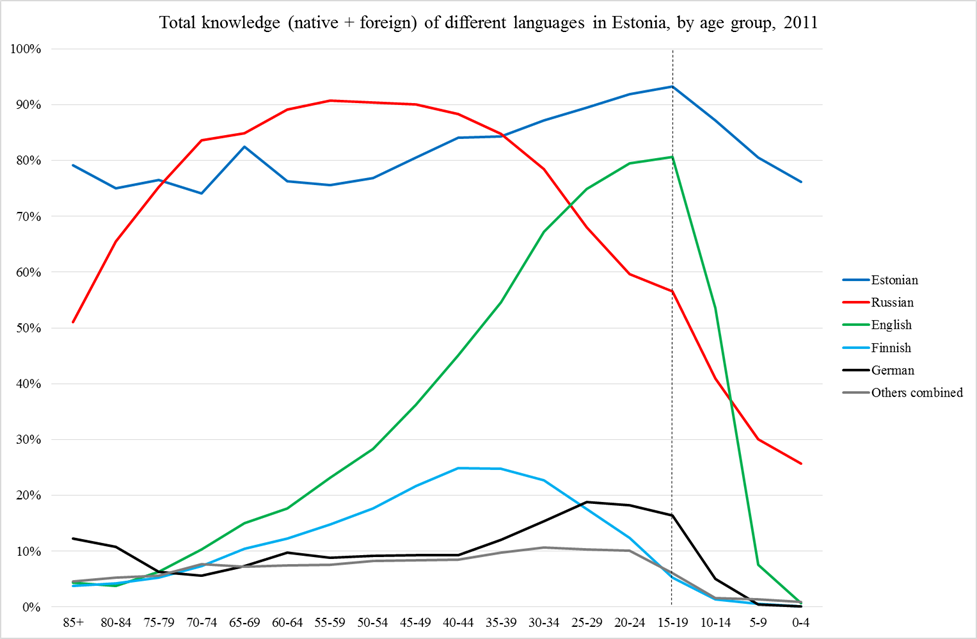
Total knowledge (native + foreign) of different languages in Estonia, by age group, 2011

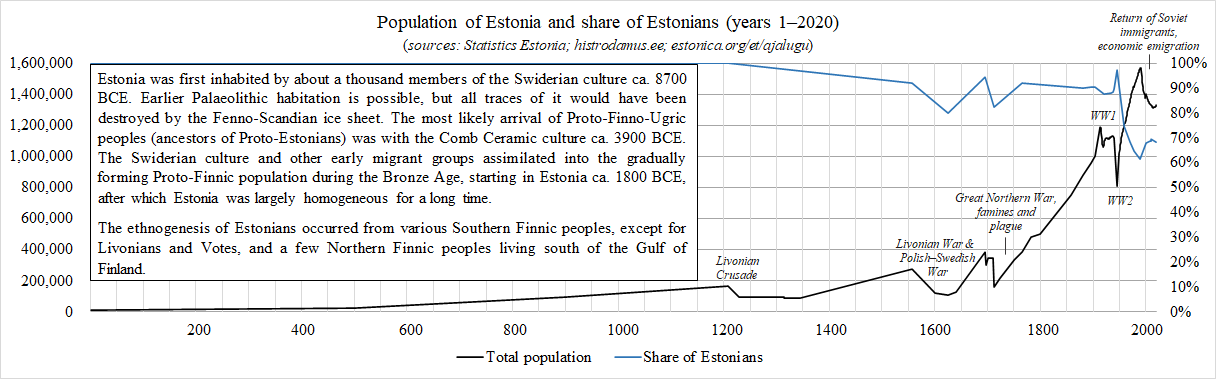
Population of Estonia and share of Estonians (years 1–2020)

Many languages are spoken in Estonia, including Estonian (official), Võro, Russian, Ukrainian, English, Finnish, German and others. According to the census of 2000, 109 languages were spoken natively in Estonia. By 2011, the number of languages spoken natively had increased to 157, mainly due to new immigrants. However, most of these languages were used only between relatives or compatriots, while only 30 languages were spoken on a daily basis in families.

Estonian and Finnish are closely related, belonging to the same Finnic branch of the Uralic language family. The two languages are only partially mutually intelligible, although learning to comprehend and speak each other's languages is fairly easy for native speakers. Estonian and Finnish are only distantly related to the Hungarian language.

Written with the Latin script, Estonian is the language of the Estonian people and the official language of the country. One-third of the standard vocabulary is derived from adding suffixes to root words. The oldest known examples of written Estonian originate in 13th century chronicles. During the Soviet era, the Russian language was imposed in parallel to, and often instead of, Estonian in official use.

Population of Estonia by first language
Language	2000 census		2011 census		2021 census	
Language	Number	%	Number	%	Number	%
Estonian	921,817	67.28%	887,216	68.54%	895,493	67.23%
Russian	406,755	29.69%	383,118	29.60%	379,210	28.47%
Ukrainian	12,299	0.90%	8,016	0.62%	12,431	0.93%
Finnish	4,932	0.36%	2,621	0.20%	4,276	0.32%
Belarusian	5,197	0.38%	1,664	0.13%	1,650	0.12%
Latvian	1,389	0.10%	999	0.08%	2,510	0.19%
Lithuanian	1,198	0.09%	905	0.07%	1,110	0.08%
English	248	0.02%	878	0.07%	3,879	0.29%
Tatar	1,251	0.09%	806	0.06%	645	0.05%
Armenian	719	0.05%	717	0.06%	842	0.06%
Azerbaijani	592	0.04%	656	0.05%	1,118	0.08%
German	557	0.04%	522	0.04%	1,834	0.14%
Polish	674	0.05%	435	0.03%	693	0.05%
Other	3,235	0.24%	2,891	0.22%	17,957	1.35%
Unknown	9,189	0.67%	1,723	0.13%	8,176	0.61%
Total	1,370,052		1,294,455		1,331,824	

Population of Estonia by command of foreign languages (as not the first language)
Language	2000 census		2011 census		2021 census	
Language	Number	%	Number	%	Number	%
English	345,854	25.2%	495,420	37.8%	622,560	46.7%
Russian	578,004	42.1%	545,537	41.5%	508,060	38.1%
Estonian	167,804	12.2%	177,286	13.7%	223,950	16.8%
Finnish	138,354	10%	167,315	12.7%	138,300	10.4%
German	140,004	10.2%	130,191	10.0%	89,650	6.7%
French	9,912	0.7%	18,677	1.4%	18,540	1.4%
Swedish	9,345	0.6%	13,990	1.1%	14,540	1.1%
Other	20,385	1.5%	39,761	2.8%	33,150	2.5%

Census data show that in 2021 an estimated 76% of Estonia's population speak a foreign language. While 10 years ago the most widely spoken foreign language in Estonia was Russian, today it is English. Estonian is spoken by 84% of the population: 67% speak it as a mother tongue and 17% as a foreign language.

== Religion ==
Religion in Estonia (2011)
1. Eastern Orthodoxy (24.1%)
2. Lutheranism (9.91%)
3. Other religions (3.25%)
4. Undeclared (8.55%)
5. Non-religious (54.1%)

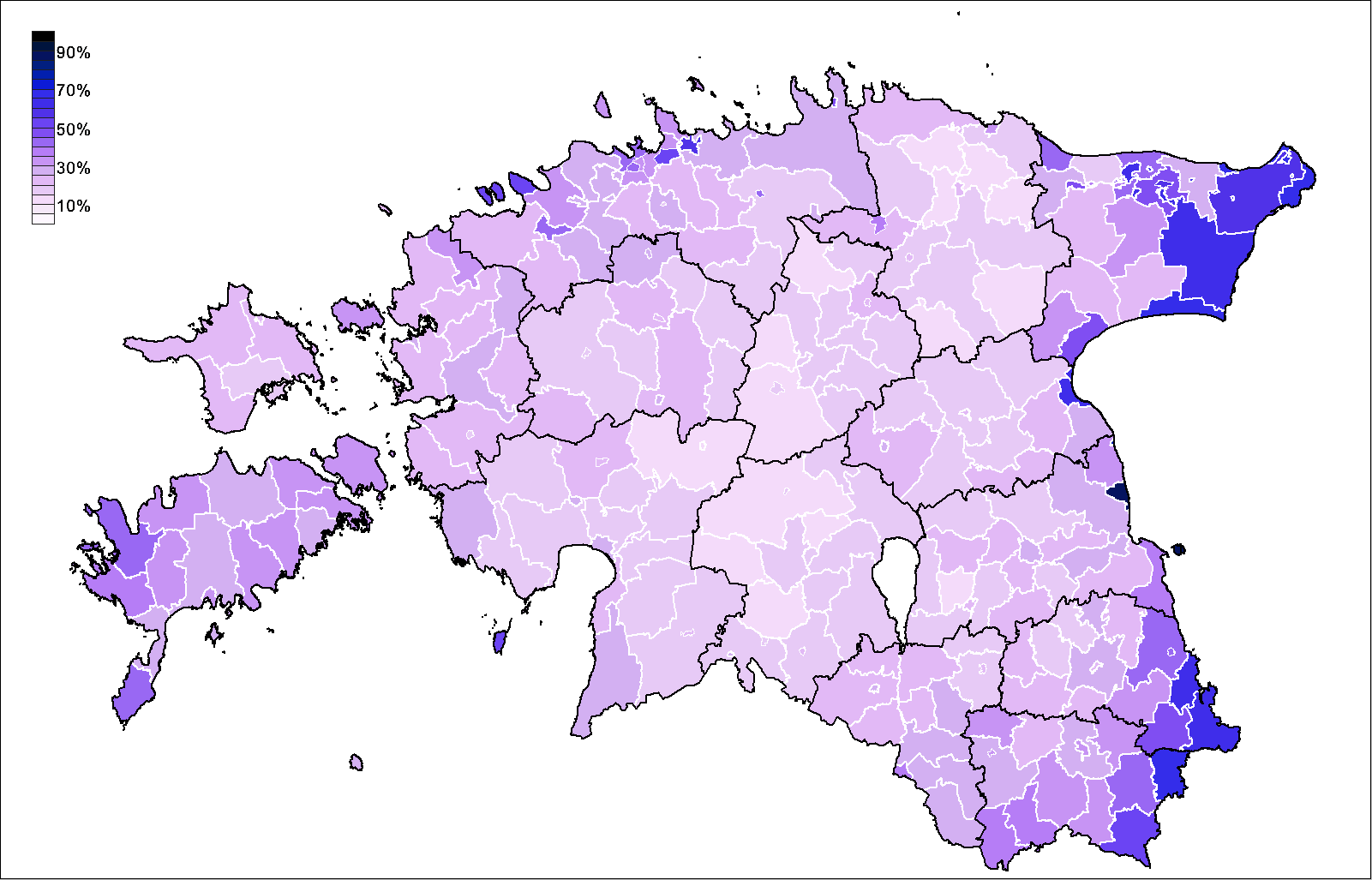
Share of religious people in regions

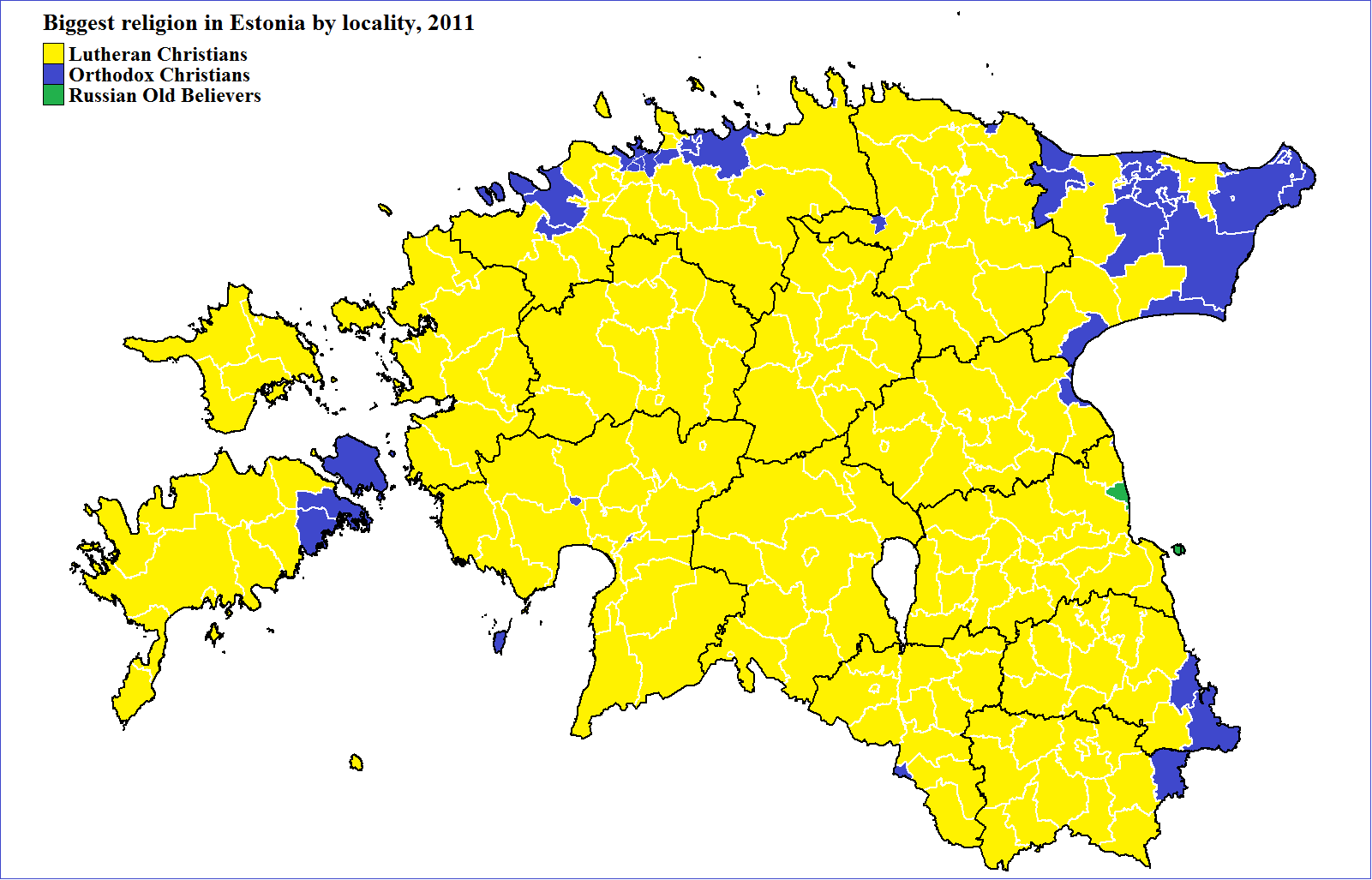
Plurality religion in regions

According to the Eurobarometer Poll in 2010, 18% of Estonian residents responded that "they believe there is a God", whereas 50% answered that "they believe there is some sort of spirit or life force" and 29% that "they do not believe there is any sort of spirit, god, or life force". This, according to the survey, would have made Estonians the most non-religious people in the then 27-member European Union. A survey conducted in 2006–2008 by Gallup showed that 14% of Estonians answered positively to the question: "Is religion an important part of your daily life?", which was the lowest among 143 countries polled.

In 2011, according to the census, 29.31% of the population considered themselves to be related to any religion:

- 16.15% Orthodox Christians
- 9.91% Lutheran Christians
- 0.41% Baptists
- 0.41% Roman Catholics
- 0.36% Jehovah's Witnesses
- 0.24% Old Believers
- 0.17% Pentecostals
- 0.14% Muslims
- 0.11% Adventists
- 0.10% Methodists
- 3.25% Other religions

Lutheranism is the dominant religion among ethnic Estonians. Eastern Orthodoxy is practiced mainly among the Russian-speaking community, but also by the Setos in south-eastern Estonia. Ethnic Estonians in the islands of Kihnu, Muhu and parts of Saaremaa are also majority Orthodox as a legacy of 19th century conversions from Lutheranism.

The organisation Maavalla Koda unites revival movements of pre-Christian Estonian beliefs.

== See also ==
- Estonization
- Baltic Germans
- Estonian Swedes
- Russians in Estonia
- Võros
- Aging of Europe
