= Friedrich Lustig =

Estonian Buddhist monk

Friedrich Voldemar Lustig (monastic name Ashin Ananda; 26 April 1912, Narva - 4 April 1989, Yangon) was an Estonian Buddhist monk, poet, poetry translator and publicist.

In 1952, the newspaper Stockholms-Tidningen Estonia wrote about him quite aptly that "as a serious Buddhist and an even more serious disciple of Tennisons, he (i.e. Lustig) follows him everywhere and has been a faithful support and advocate in all the difficulties of recent years". Together they migrated to Southeast Asia in 1931, living first in Thailand and then, from 1949, in Burma, which remained their last home.

Lustig served Tennisons faithfully until the latter's death in 1962. During Tennisons' lifetime, he called himself "the student and secretary of the Buddhist Archbishop of Latvia" and, less frequently, "the Episcopal Vicar for Estonia". After the death of Karl Tõnisson (Brother Vahindra), he inherited the semi-official episcopal title of his teacher.

== Biography ==
=== Early life ===
Friedrich Voldemar Lustig was born on 26 April 1912 in Narva. His father, Friedrich Adam Lustig, was a jeweller and school teacher in the same town, his mother, Emilie, was of Latvian nationality and from Jelgava.

Her parents married only after the birth of her son. A year and a half later, Friedrich Voldemar had a younger brother, Bruno Paul, who later became a doctor. In 1939 his mother Emilie and his brother Bruno moved to Germany, his father having died in 1935.

The year 1930 turned out to be a breakthrough, when Karl Tõnisson arrived to preach in Narva. Lustig, who had just graduated from high school, hesitantly joined the latter and, despite his parents' prohibitions, left his hometown permanently. Vahindra and his young disciple initially lived for a while in Kloostri Street in Tartu. According to contemporary recollections, his mother made many trips from Narva to Tartu to convince her son to return to secular life, but young Friedrich Voldemar Lustig was determined to remain to live as a Buddhist monastic.

When Prince Aditya Jumbhor and Princess Kobkoen of Siam arrived in Estonia in November 1930, Tennisons and Lustig also tried to contact them. In the newspapers of the time, there are photos of the royal couple leaving Tallinn Town Hall, opposite the 'barefoot Tõnisson' and the young Lustig, dressed in the latest fashion. It is said that it was Lustig who read out Tennisons' address in impeccable French at the same place. They did not receive the funds for their trip to Siam. At the end of the same year, Tennisons and Lustig went to Riga, where Lustig was ordained as a novice monk in the local Buddhist temple of Imanta on 27 November 1930. On 12 December 1933, Lustig was fully ordained in Thailand.

== Creations ==
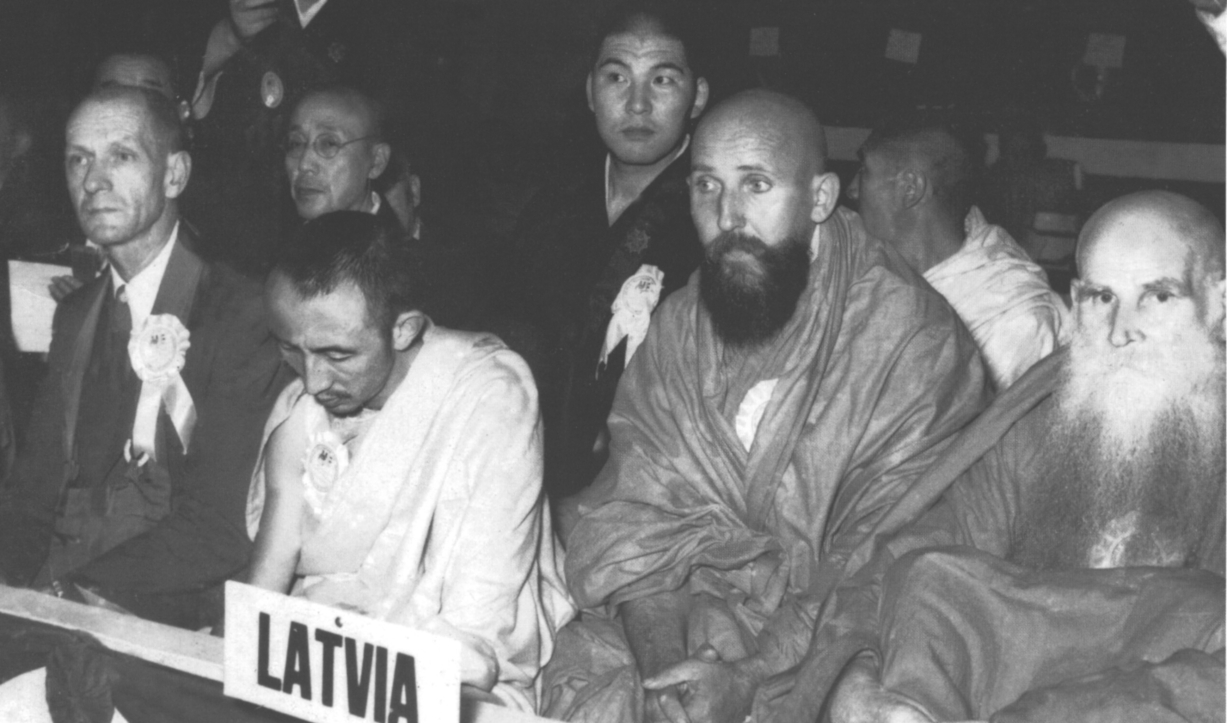
Friedrich Lustig (third from left) and Brother Vahindra at a Buddhist conference in Rangoon (1954)

It was after the death of Tennisons that Lustig began to publish more poetry. His first known poem, written in Russian, appeared in early 1927 in the newspaper Novy Narvski Listok (Russian: Новый Нарвский листок) when the author was only 14 years old. He started writing poetry again in the mid-1960s. Around the same time, he started translating Burmese poetry into English. This led to the publication of the first translation collections, Burmese Classical Poems (1967, some say 1966), A Glimpse of Contemporary Burmese Poetry (1968), Burmese Poems through the Ages (1969), and the collection of his own poems, Fluttering Leaves: a collection of 60 poems (1970).

At the 1968 California Poetry Festival, Lustig was awarded the Lilac Laureate for Poetry for his services to the cultivation of Buddhist poetry. In the meantime, almost no issue of the Burmese cultural magazine The Guardian Magazine was published without a poem or article by Lustig.
