= Statistics Estonia =

Government agency of Estonia

- Estonian: Statistikaamet

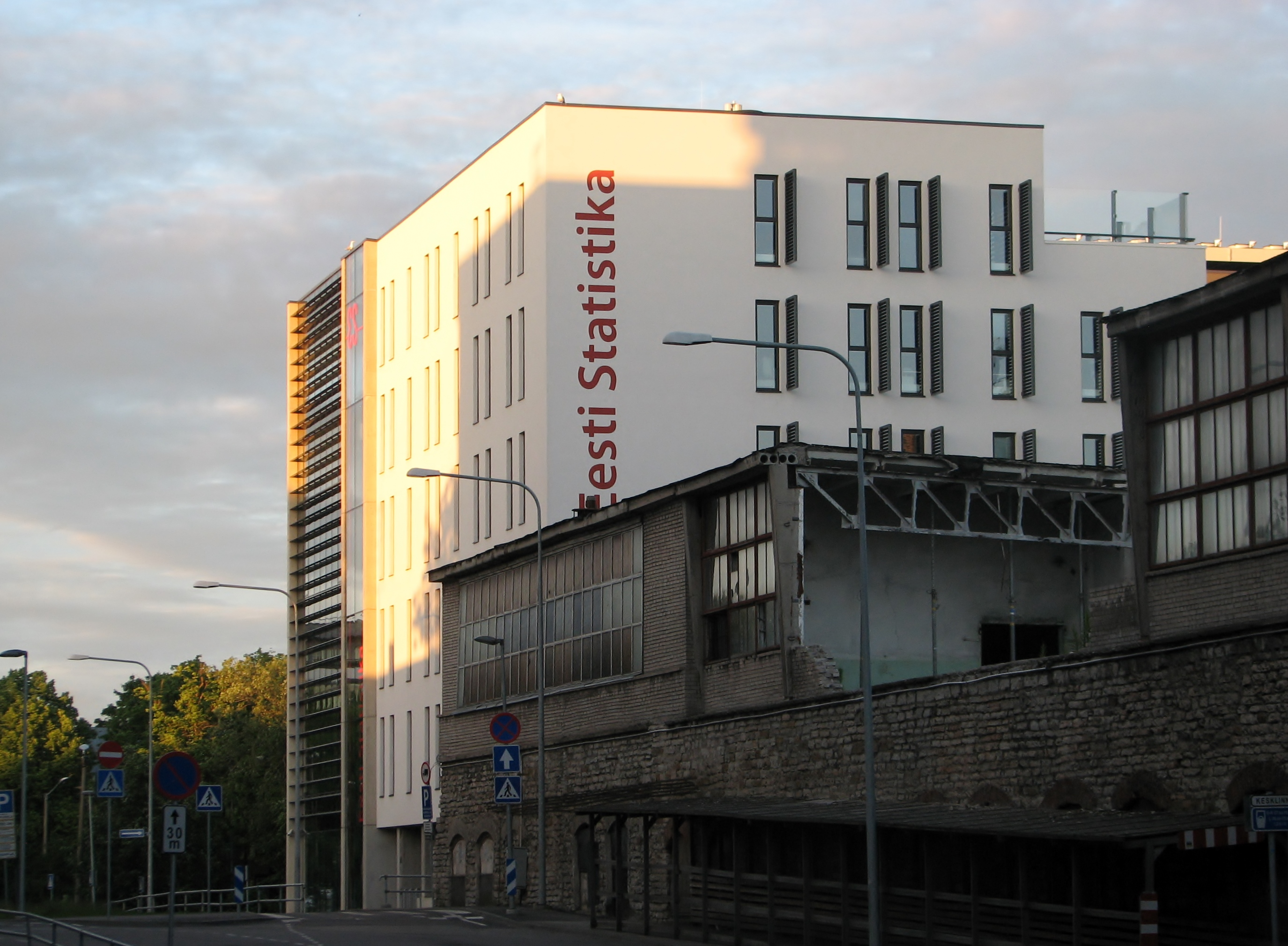

Agency overview
- Formed: 1991
- Jurisdiction: Government of Estonia
- Headquarters: Tatari 51, Tallinn; 59°25′46.27″N 24°44′6.73″E
- Agency executive: Urmet Lee, Director General
- Parent agency: Ministry of Finance
- Website: www.stat.ee

Statistics Estonia (Estonian: Statistikaamet) is the Estonian government agency responsible for producing official statistics regarding Estonia. It is part of the Ministry of Finance.

The agency has approximately 320 employees. The office of the agency is in Tatari, Tallinn.

== Statistics ==
In November 2018, Statistics Estonia had released a metric of the exports of goods which showed increase by 18% while in December of the same year the industrial producer price index had fallen by .6% in comparison to last month but rose by 1.6%.

According to the Statistics Estonia, it weighed pork production of the country and confirmed that the pork production had decreased from 50,000 tons in 2015 to 38,400 in 2017 as a result of the African swine fever virus. In 2019, Statistics Estonia estimated that there were 1,323,820 people living in the country as of 1 January 2019, which is 4,690 more than the previous year.

== See also ==
- Demographics of Estonia
- Census in Estonia
- 2011 Estonia Census
- Eurostat
