= Salme =

Salme may refer to:

== People ==
=== Given name ===
- Salme Ekbaum (1912–1995), Estonian writer and poet
- Salme Geransar, Iranian-Australian actress
- Salme Kann (1881–1957), Estonian voice teacher and choir director
- Salme Nõmmik (1910–1988), Estonian economic geographer and professor
- Salme Peetson (1885–1967), Estonian actress
- Salme Pekkala-Dutt (1888–1964), Estonian-British communist politician
- Salme Poopuu (1939–2017), Estonian filmmaker and actress
- Salme Rosalie Riig (1903–1973), Estonian sculptor and printmaker
- Salme Reek (1907–1996), Estonian actress
- Salme Rootare (1913–1987), Estonian chess master
- Salme Setälä (1894–1980), Finnish architect and writer

=== Surname ===
- Jean-Baptiste Salme (1766–1811), French general of the Napoleonic Wars
- Thomas Salme (b.1969), Convicted of flying passenger jets without a commercial pilot's license

== Geography ==
- Salme, Nepal
- Salme Parish, municipality in Saare County, Estonia
  - Salme, Estonia, settlement in Salme Parish
- Salme, Abkhazia, in Georgia

== Other ==
- Salme ships, two clinker-built ships of Viking Scandinavian origin discovered in Salme village on the island of Saaremaa, Estonia
