= Salme Parish =

Former municipality of Estonia

Coordinates: 58°09′41″N 22°14′59″E

Salme Parish Salme vald
- Former municipality of Estonia
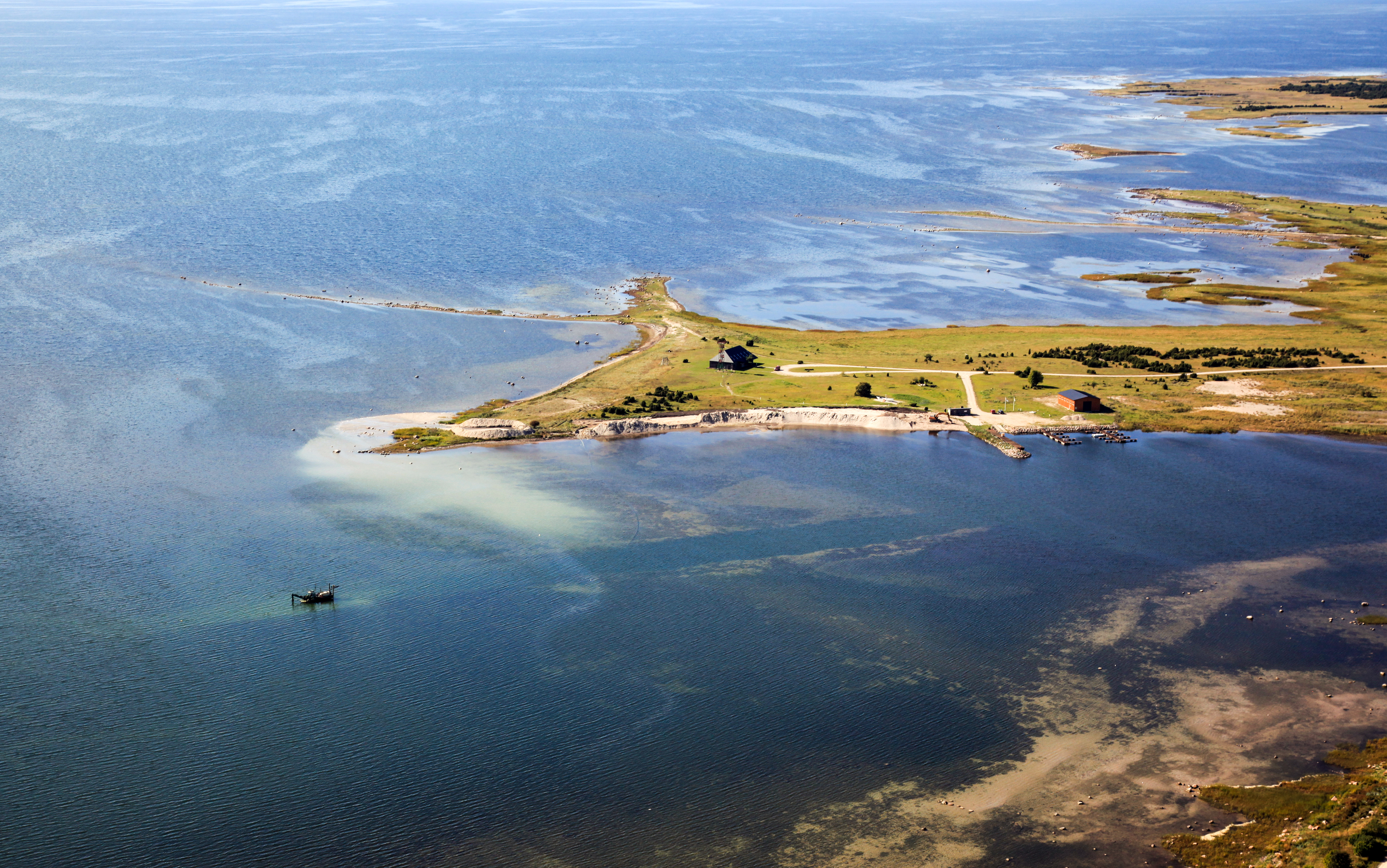
- Lõmala harbour

- Flag Coat of arms

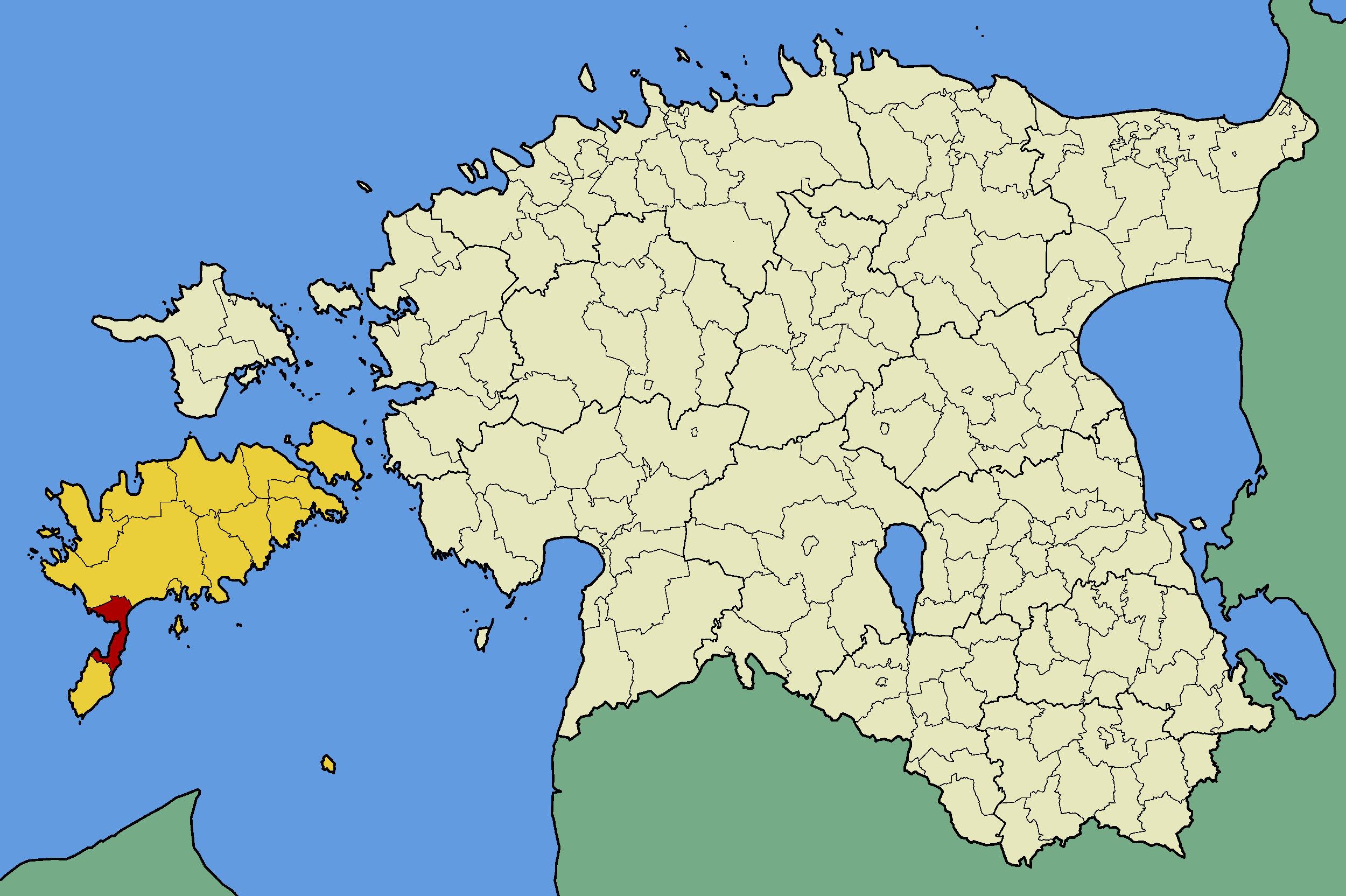
- Salme Parish within Saare County.
- Country: Estonia
- County: Saare County
- Administrative centre: Salme

Government
  - Mayor: Kalmer Poopuu

Area
  - Total: 115.07 km^{2} (44.43 sq mi)

Population (01.01.2009)
  - Total: 1,249
  - Density: 10.85/km^{2} (28.11/sq mi)

Salme Parish was a municipality in Saare County, Estonia. It contained the northern half of the Sõrve Peninsula of the island of Saaremaa.

Besides the small borough Salme there were 24 villages: Anseküla, Easte, Hindu, Imara, Järve, Kaimri, Kaugatoma, Läätsa, Lahetaguse, Länga, Lassi, Lõmala, Lõu, Metsalõuka, Mõisaküla, Möldri, Rahuste, Suurna, Tehumardi, Tiirimetsa, Toomalõuka, Ula, Üüdibe, Vintri.

Prior to 1936, the municipality was called Abruka. During the Second World War, the Battle of Tehumardi took place in Salme. The location is marked by a 21-metre Soviet monument.

During the administrative-territorial reform in 2017, all 12 municipalities on the island Saaremaa were merged into a single municipality – Saaremaa Parish.

== See also ==
- Municipalities of Estonia
- List of municipalities of Estonia
- The Salme ships - Two clinker-built ships with the remains of 40 persons was found autumn 2008.
