= Tehumardi =

Village in Estonia

- Village
- Location in Estonia
- Coordinates: 58°10′52″N 22°14′47″E
- Country: Estonia
- County: Saare County
- Municipality: Saaremaa Parish

Population (2011 Census)
  - Total: 77

Tehumardi is a village in Saaremaa Parish, Saare County, Estonia, on the island of Saaremaa. As of the 2011 census, the settlement's population was 77.

== Name ==
Tehumardi was attested in historical sources as theomarte in 1645, Teho Mardi Teho in 1690, tehho Mardi Rein in 1723, and Teomart and Tehhorardi in 1798. The name refers to a single-hide farm and is a compound of two personal names. The first part may derive from Stefanus (> Tehu) or Theodor (> Teo), and the second part comes from Mart (genitive: Mardi).

== History ==
Before the administrative reform in 2017, the village was in Salme Parish.

== Battle of Tehumardi Memorial ==
During World War II on 8 October 1944, the Battle of Tehumardi took place near the village. A memorial was erected in 1966. Because the memorial bears Soviet-era text and symbols, in 2025 the local government on Saaremaa covered the text and symbols ahead of the tourism season.

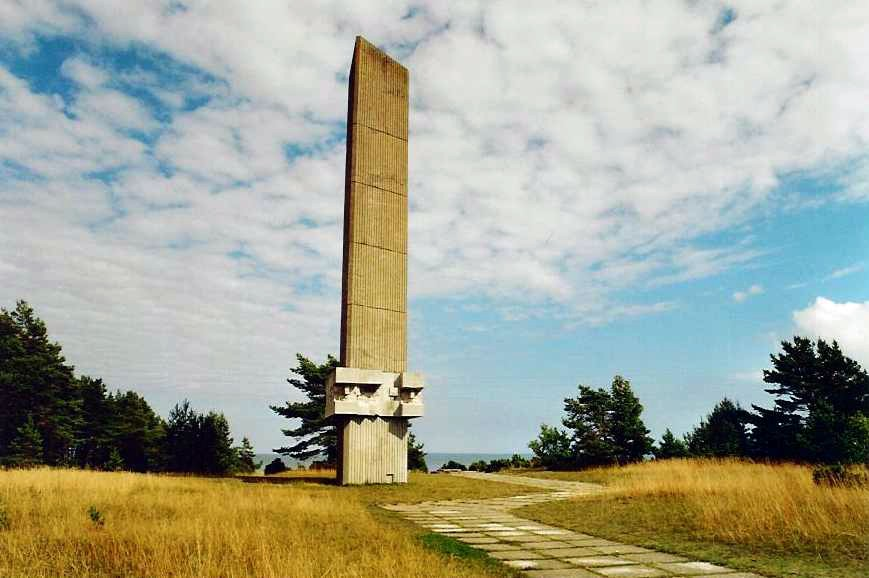
Tehumardi memorial

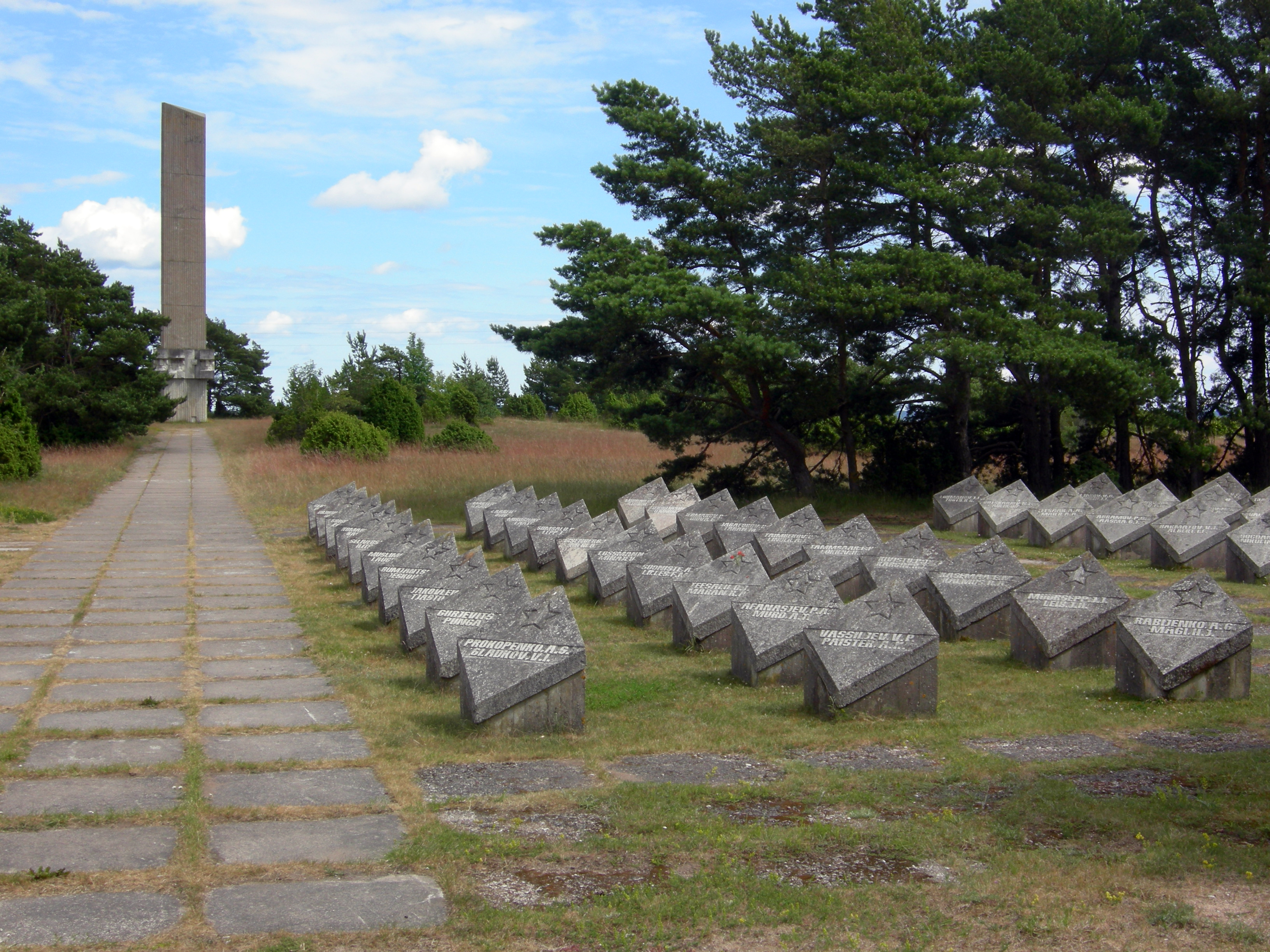
Tehumardi cemetery

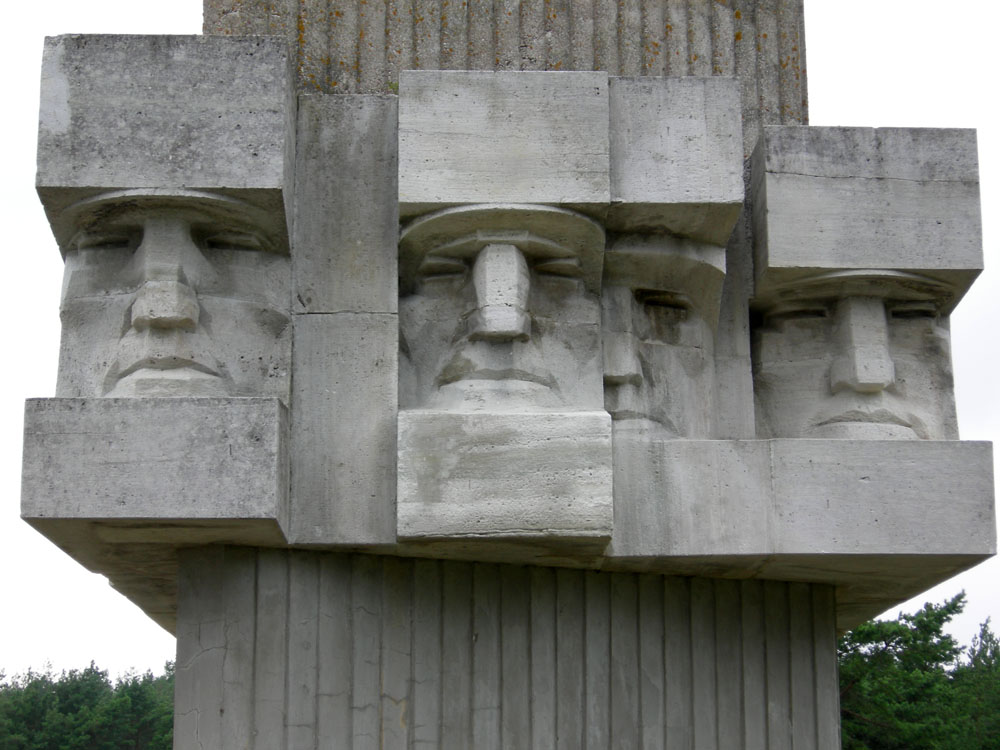
Tehumardi memorial

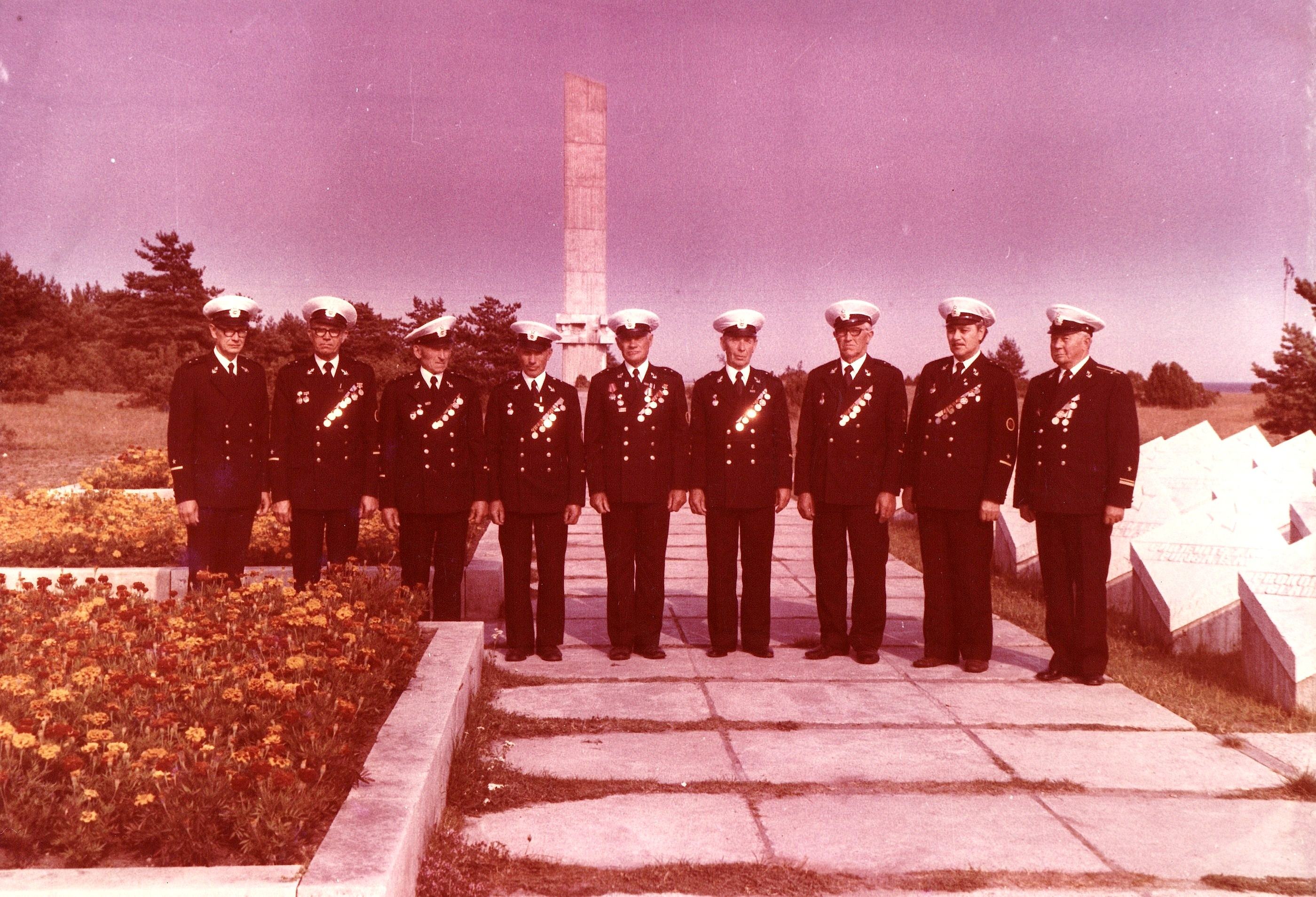
Tehumardi Estonian Rifle Corps War Veterans Ensemble in Tehumardi, 1980

== Gallery ==
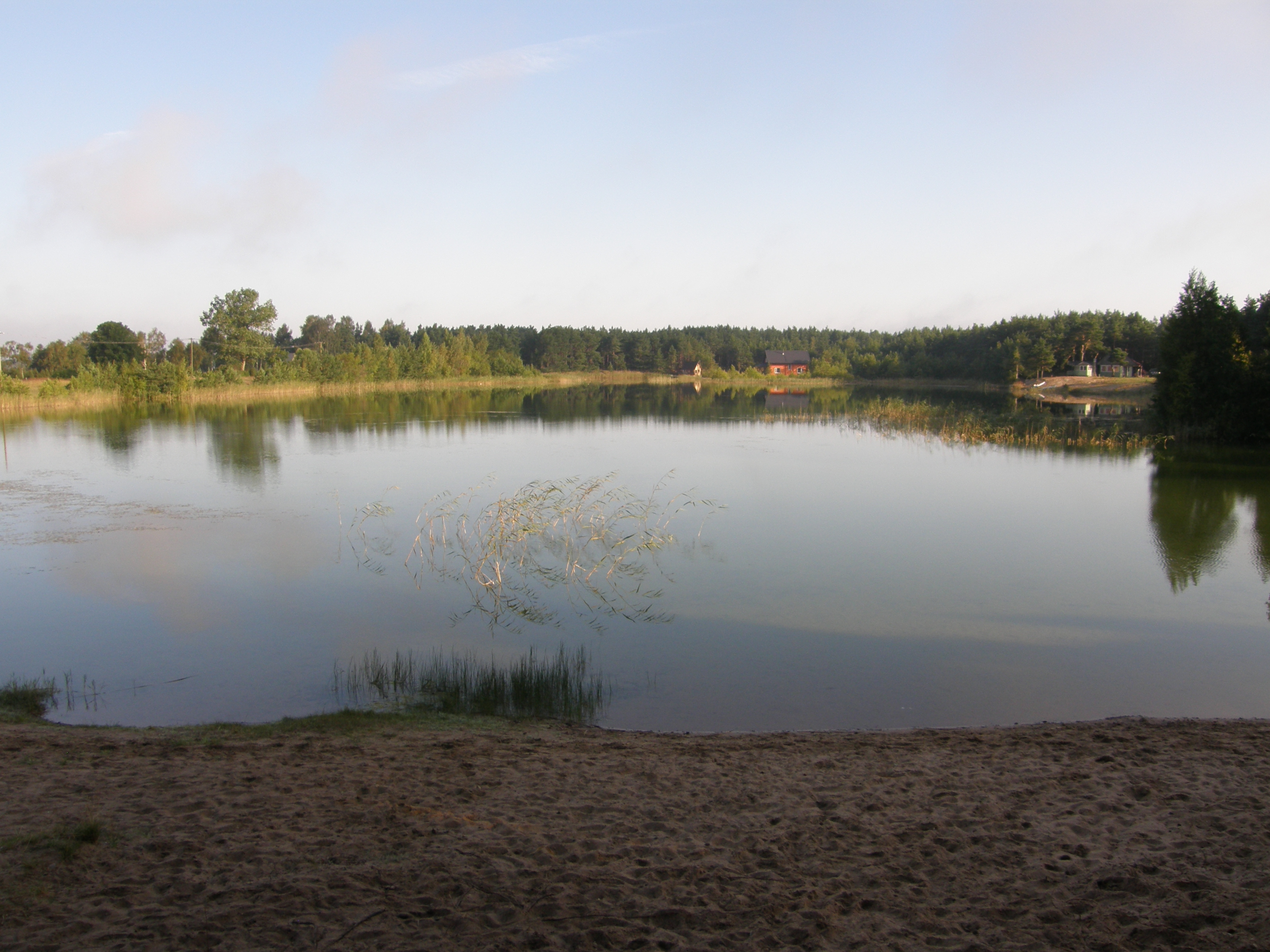
Tehumardi quarry

== See also ==
- Moonsund Landing Operation
- Salme River
