= Kaugatoma =

Village in Estonia

- Village
- Location in Estonia
- Coordinates: 58°07′33″N 22°12′05″E
- Country: Estonia
- County: Saare County
- Municipality: Saaremaa Parish

Population (2011 Census)
  - Total: 6

Kaugatoma (1977–1997 Kaugatuma) is a village in Saaremaa Parish, Saare County, Estonia, on the island of Saaremaa. As of the 2011 census, the settlement's population was 6.

Kaugatoma is located on the eastern coast of Kaugatoma Bay (part of the Baltic Sea) where the 2.5 metres (8.2 ft) high and 1.125 kilometres (0.699 mi) long Kaugatoma cliff is situated.

Before the administrative reform in 2017, the village was in Salme Parish. During the reform, the village of Mõisaküla was merged into the village of Kaugatoma. Formerly (1977–1997), Mõisaküla was also part of Kaugatoma, but from 1997 until 2017 it was a standalone village.

== Gallery ==
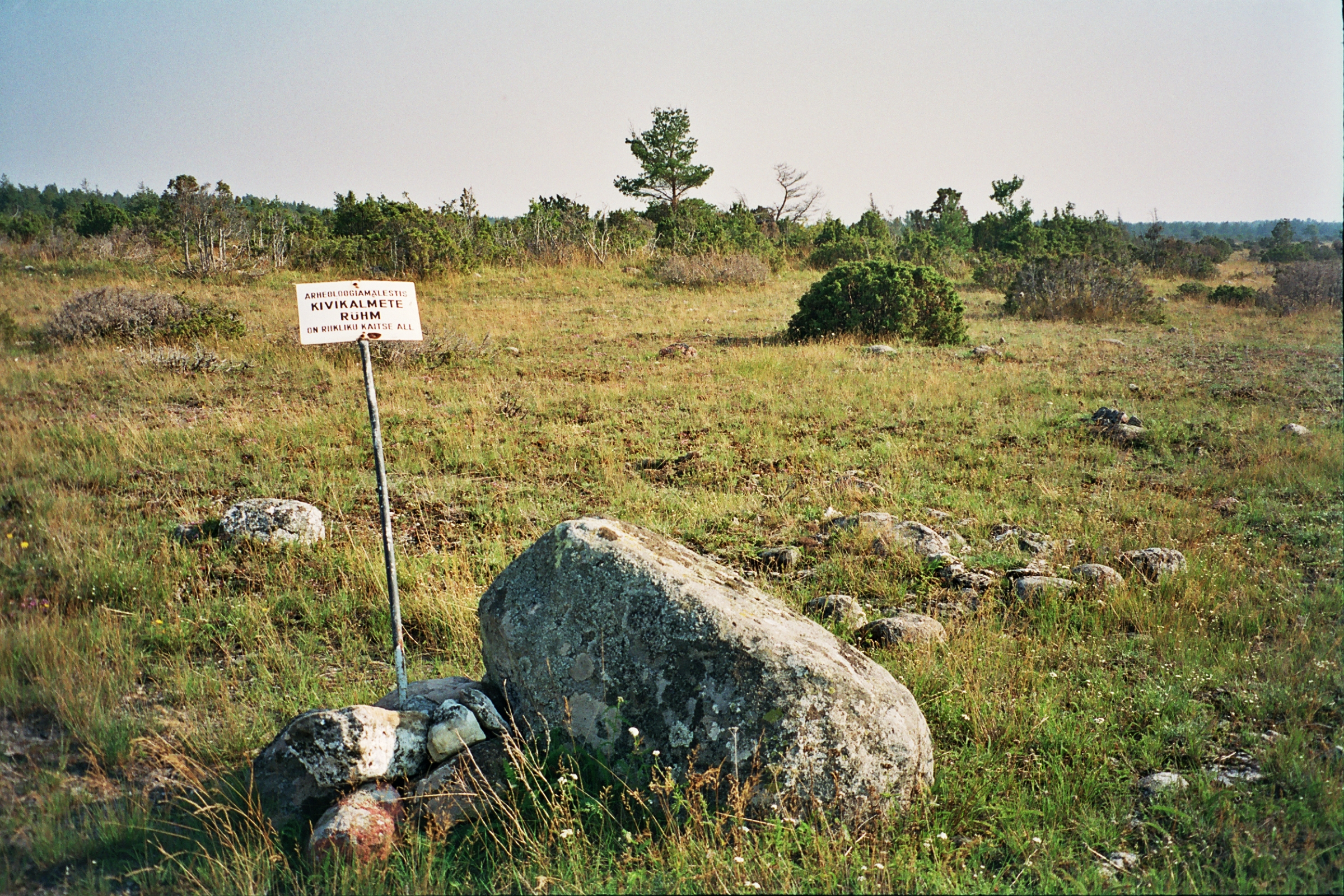
Ancient burial site in Kaugatoma.

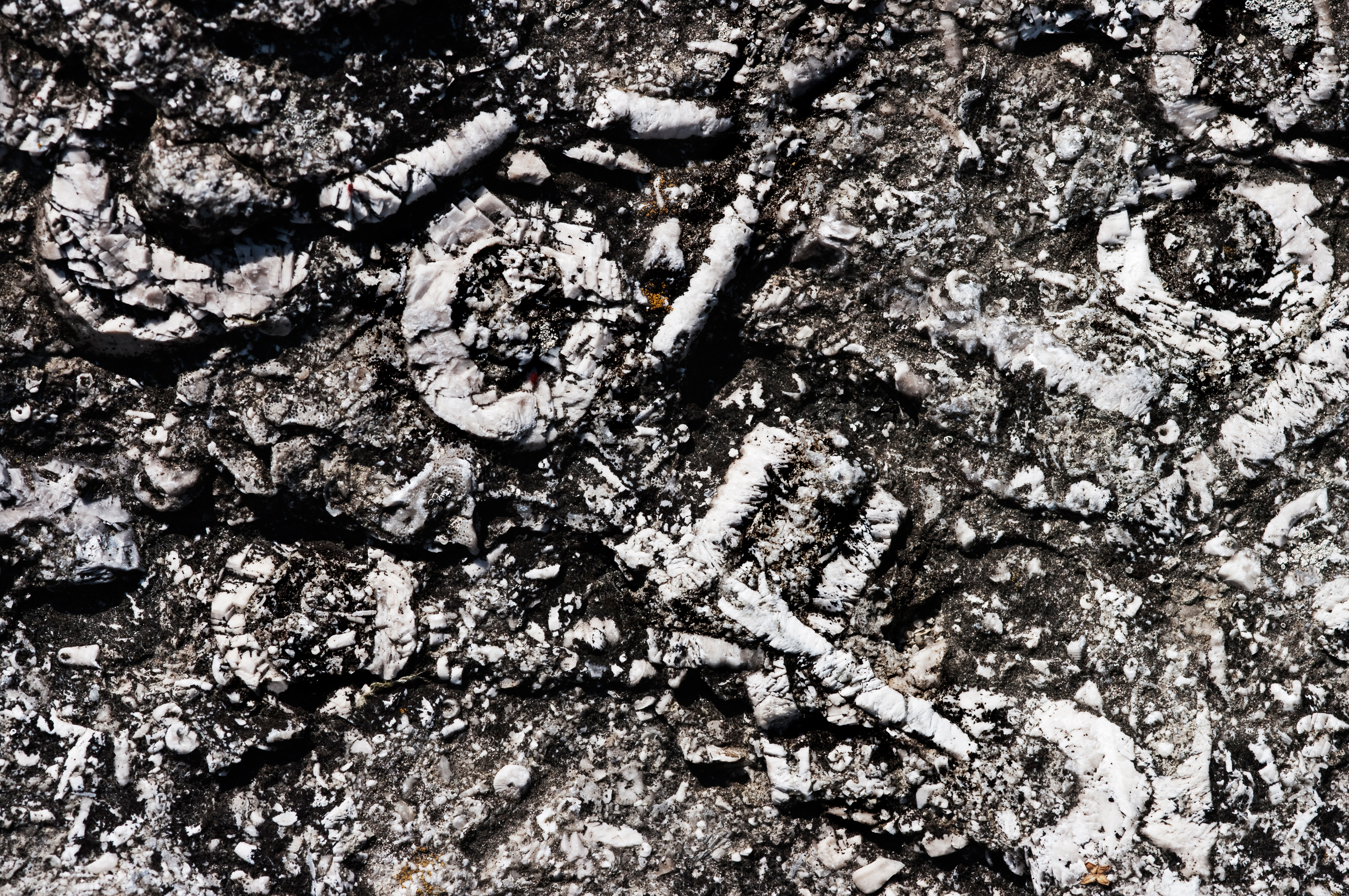
Crinoid fossils in the Kaugatoma cliff.
