= Üüdibe =

Village in Estonia

- Village
- Location in Estonia
- Coordinates: 58°09′17″N 22°13′52″E
- Country: Estonia
- County: Saare County
- Municipality: Saaremaa Parish

Population (2011 Census)
  - Total: 4

Üüdibe is a village in Saaremaa Parish, Saare County, Estonia, on the island of Saaremaa. It is located just southwest of Salme, the administrative centre of the municipality, on the northeastern coast of Kaugatoma Bay (part of the Baltic Sea). The village is bordered by Salme River to the north. As of the 2011 census, the settlement's population was 4.
