= Lahetaguse =

Village in Estonia

- Village
- Location in Estonia
- Coordinates: 58°11′17″N 22°05′16″E
- Country: Estonia
- County: Saare County
- Municipality: Saaremaa Parish

Population (2011 Census)
  - Total: 21

Lahetaguse is a village in Saaremaa Parish, Saare County, Estonia, on the island of Saaremaa. It is located on the northern coast of Kaugatoma Bay (part of the Baltic Sea). As of the 2011 census, the settlement's population was 21.

== History ==
Lahetaguse was the location of Lahetaguse (German: Lahhentagge) knight manor. Russian navigator and explorer Fabian Gottlieb von Bellingshausen (1778–1852), the discoverer of Antarctica, was born in Lahetaguse Manor. The manor was established in 1571. None of the buildings have survived.

Before the administrative reform in 2017, the village was in Salme Parish.
