= Suurna =

Village in Estonia

- Village
- Location in Estonia
- Coordinates: 58°10′39″N 22°13′03″E
- Country: Estonia
- County: Saare County
- Municipality: Saaremaa Parish

Population (2011 Census)
  - Total: 27

Suurna is a village in Saaremaa Parish, Saare County, Estonia, on the island of Saaremaa. As of the 2011 census, the settlement's population was 27.

Before the administrative reform in 2017, the village was in Salme Parish.

== See also ==
- Salme River
