= Lake Aheru =

Lake in Valga County, Estonia

- Aheru järv (Estonian)
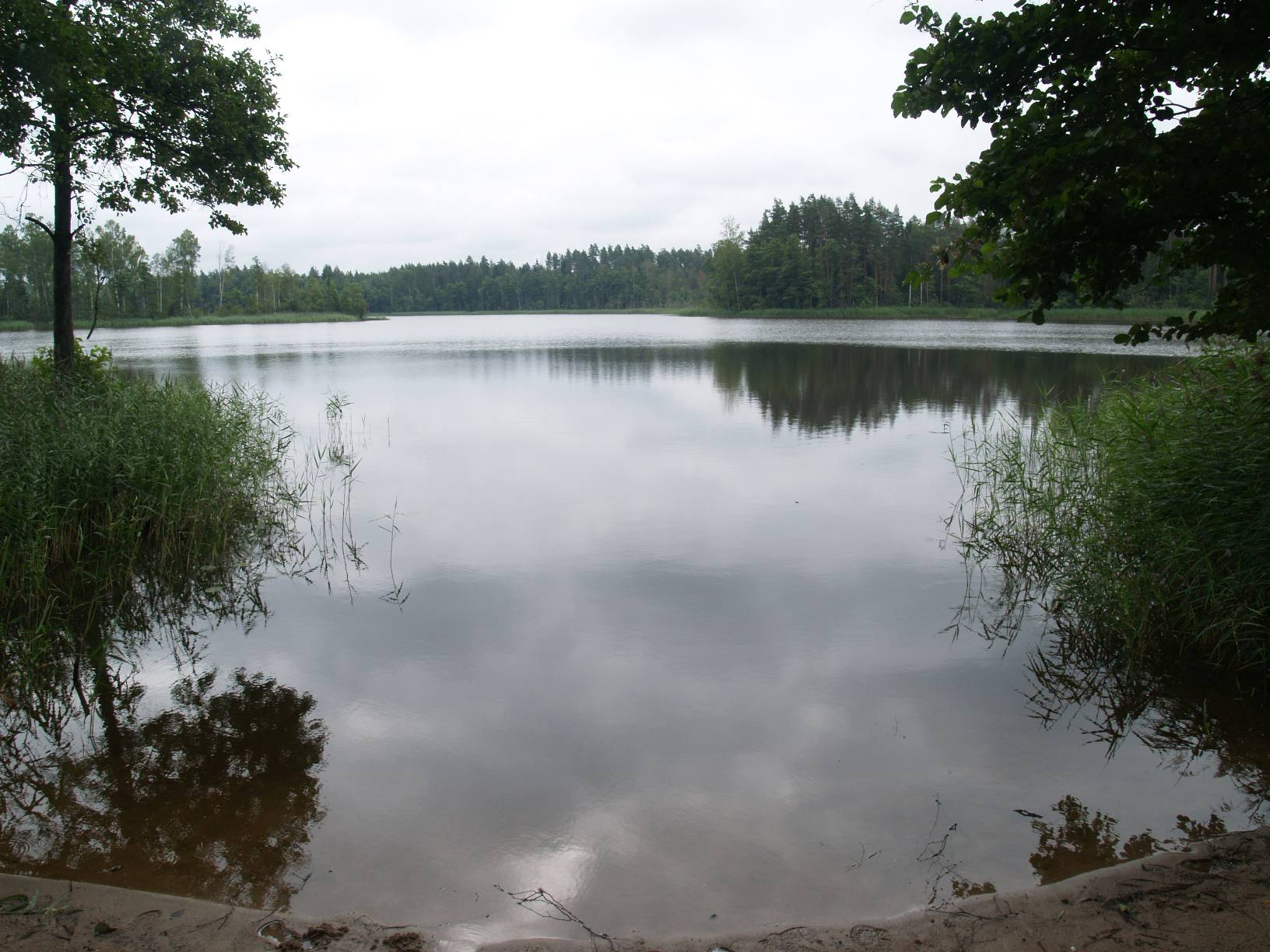

- Location within Estonia
- Location: Taheva Parish, Valga County, Estonia
- Coordinates: 57°41.5′N 26°21′E
- Basin countries: Estonia
- Max. length: 2,680 meters (8,790 ft)
- Max. width: 1,850 meters (6,070 ft)
- Surface area: 244.6 hectares (604 acres)
- Average depth: 4.0 meters (13.1 ft)
- Max. depth: 7.7 meters (25 ft)
- Water volume: 9,870,000 cubic meters (349,000,000 cu ft)
- Shore length^{1}: 10,070 meters (33,040 ft)
- Surface elevation: 69.8 m (229 ft)
- ^{1} Shore length is not a well-defined measure.

Lake Aheru (Estonian: Aheru järv, also Kandsi järv, Kansi järv, Ahero järv, Illu järv, Suurjärv, Aherjärv) is a lake in Estonia. It is part of the village of Laanemetsa in Valga County.

== Physical description ==
The lake has an area of 244.6 hectares (604 acres). The lake has an average depth of 4.0 meters (13.1 ft) and a maximum depth of 6.7 meters (22 ft). It is 2,680 meters (8,790 ft) long, and its shoreline measures 10,070 meters (33,040 ft). It has a volume of 9,870,000 cubic meters (349,000,000 cu ft).

== See also ==
- List of lakes of Estonia
