= Imara, Estonia =

Village in Estonia

Imara
- Village
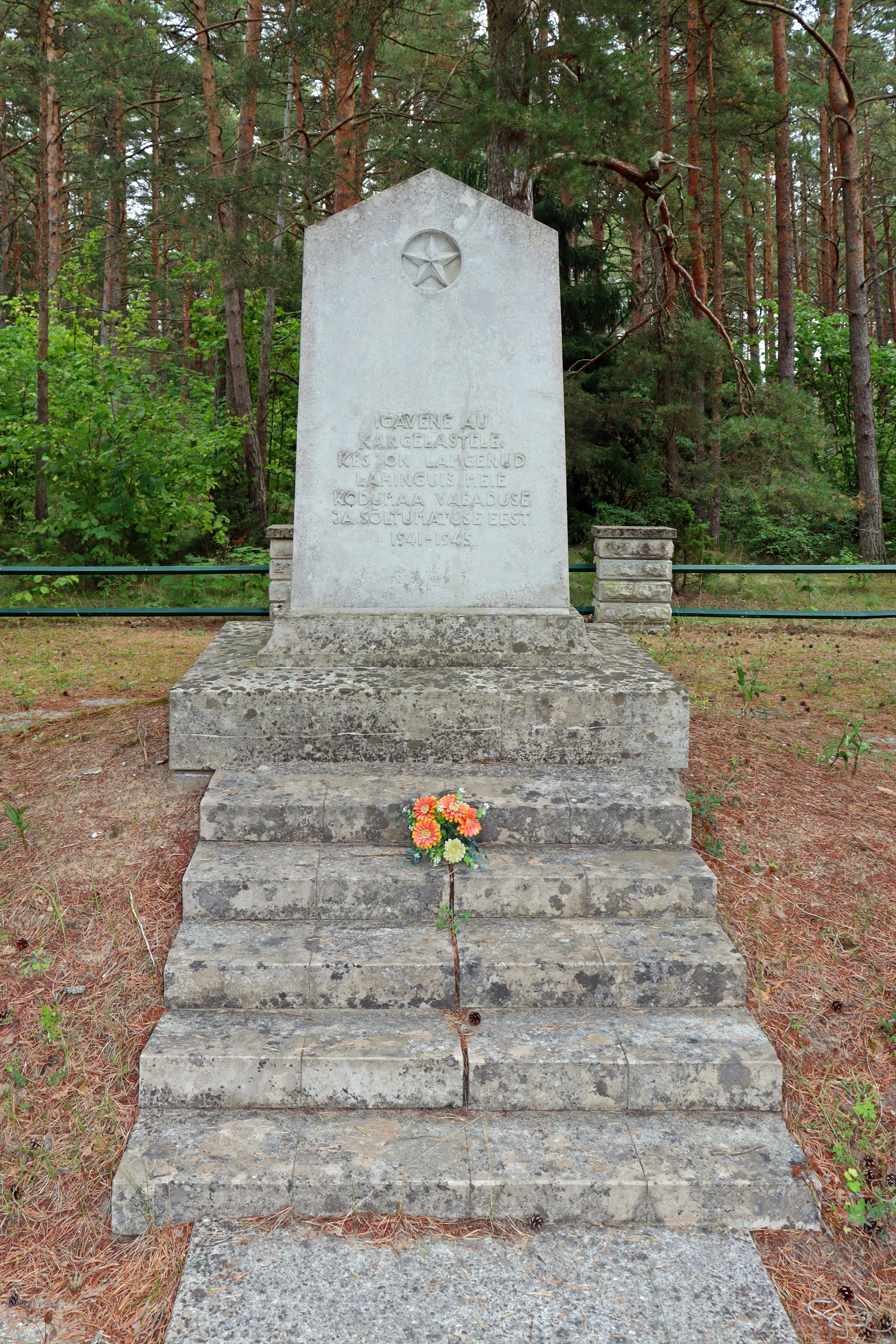

- Location in Estonia
- Coordinates: 58°07′25″N 22°14′51″E
- Country: Estonia
- County: Saare County
- Municipality: Saaremaa Parish

Population (2011 Census)
  - Total: 30

Imara is a village in Saaremaa Parish, Saare County, Estonia, on the island of Saaremaa. At the 2011 census, the settlement's population was 30.

Before the administrative reform in 2017, the village was in Salme Parish.
