= Järve, Saare County =

Village in Estonia

Järve
- Village
- Location in Estonia
- Coordinates: 58°11′47″N 22°15′19″E
- Country: Estonia
- County: Saare County
- Municipality: Saaremaa Parish

Population (2011 Census)
  - Total: 19

Järve is a village in Saaremaa Parish, Saare County, Estonia, on the island of Saaremaa. As of the 2011 census, the settlement's population was 19.

Before the administrative reform in 2017, the village was in Salme Parish.
