= Möldri, Saare County =

Village in Estonia

Mõldri
- Village
- Location in Estonia
- Coordinates: 58°10′22″N 22°08′51″E
- Country: Estonia
- County: Saare County
- Municipality: Saaremaa Parish

Population (2011 Census)
  - Total: 15

Mõldri is a village in Saaremaa Parish, Saare County, Estonia, on the island of Saaremaa. As of the 2011 census, the settlement's population was 15.

Before the administrative reform in 2017, the village was in Salme Parish.
