= Kalliküla =

Village in Estonia

- Location within Estonia
- Coordinates: 57°36′23″N 26°26′37″E
- Country: Estonia
- County: Valga County
- Time zone: UTC+2 (EET)

Kalliküla is a village in Valga Parish, Valga County in southeastern Estonia. Before 2017, it was located in Taheva Parish.

== Gallery ==
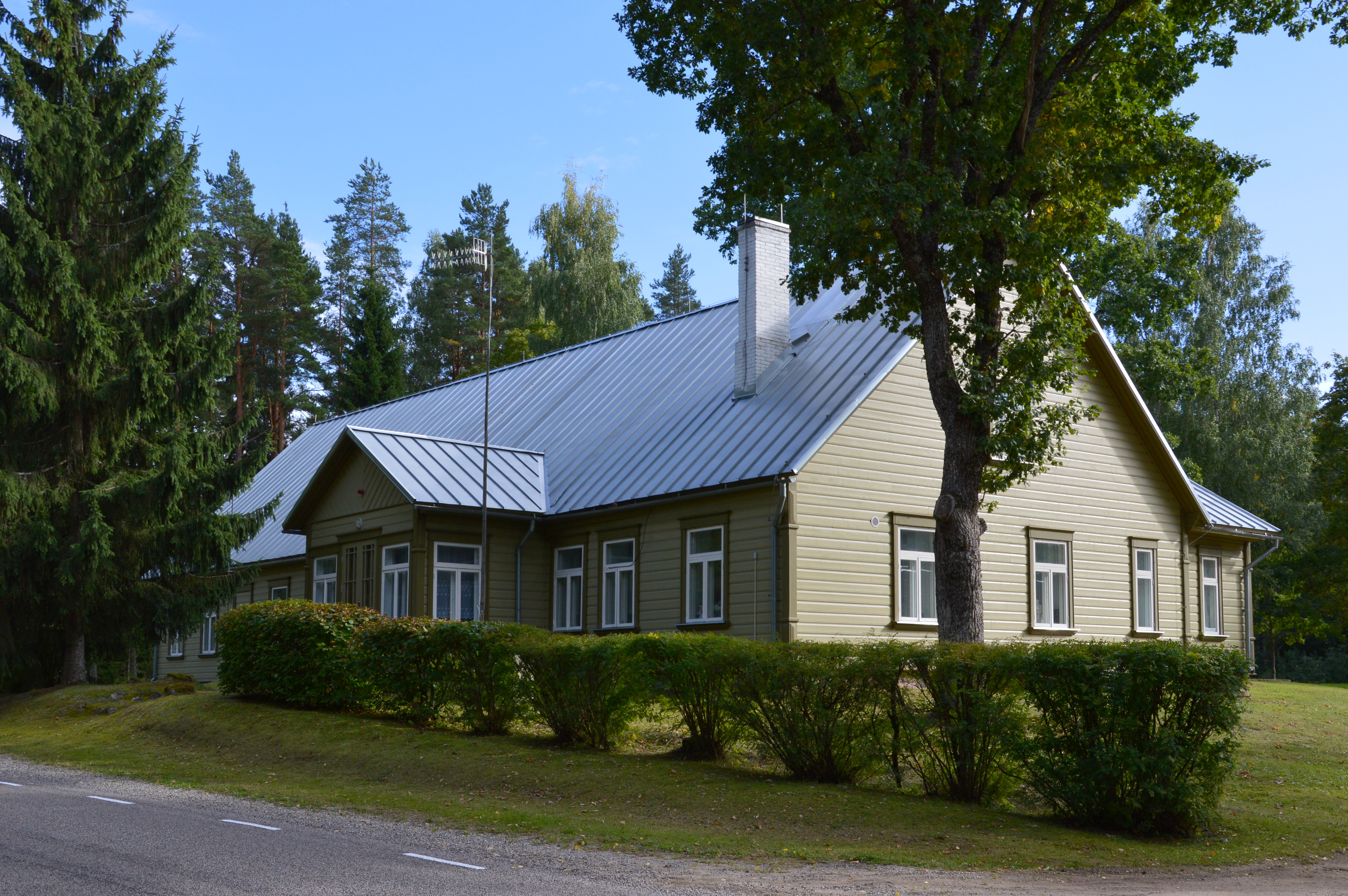

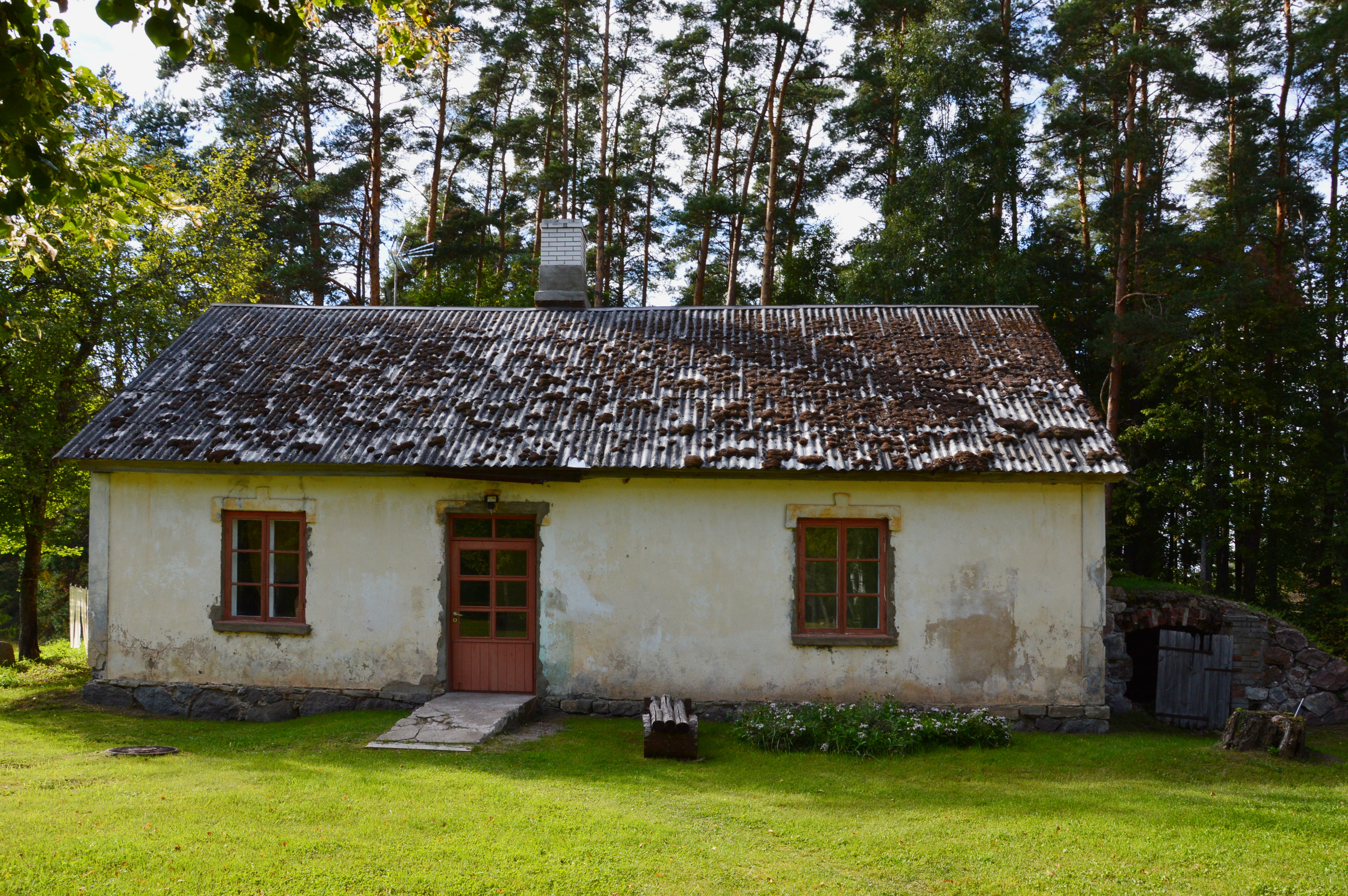

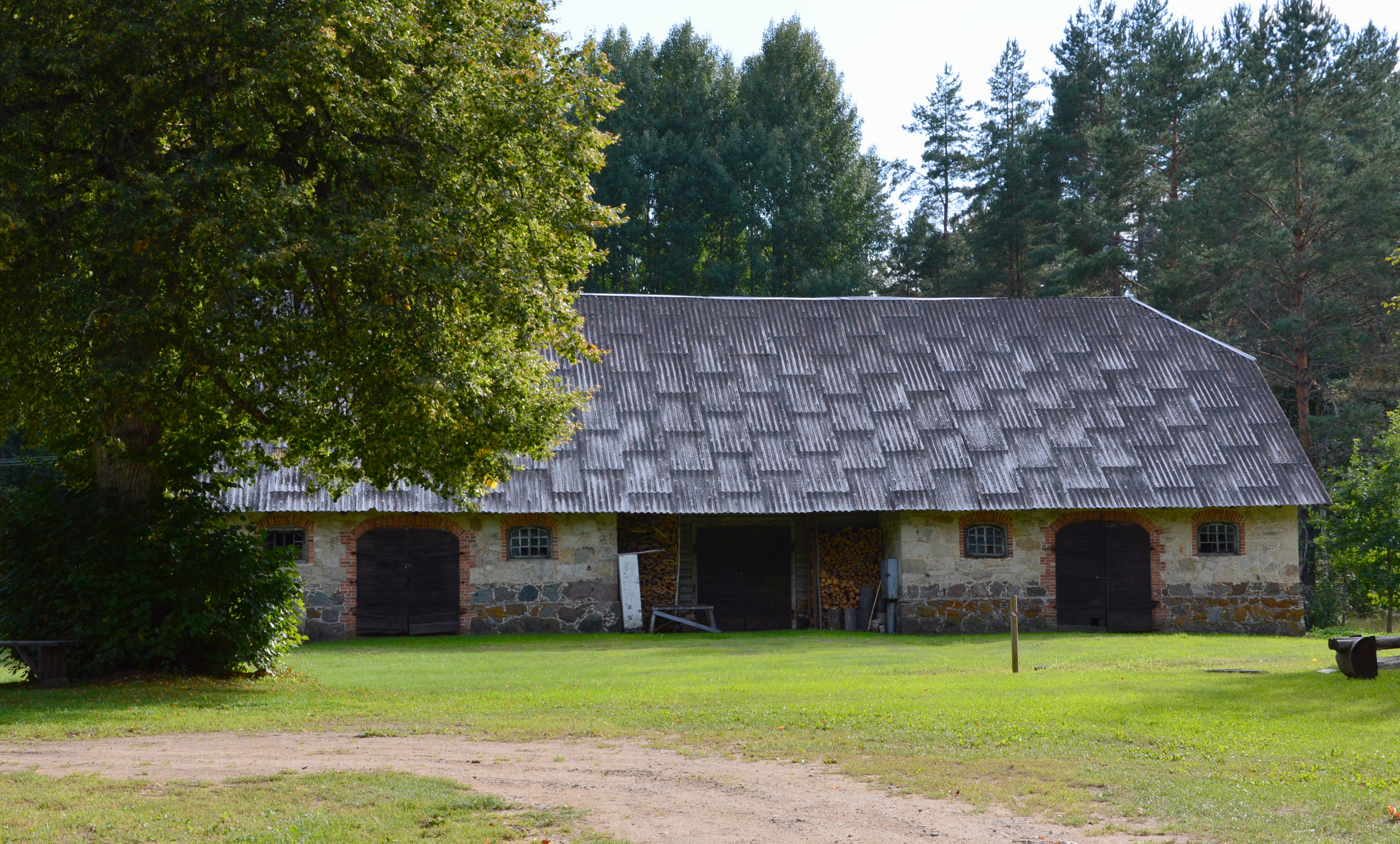

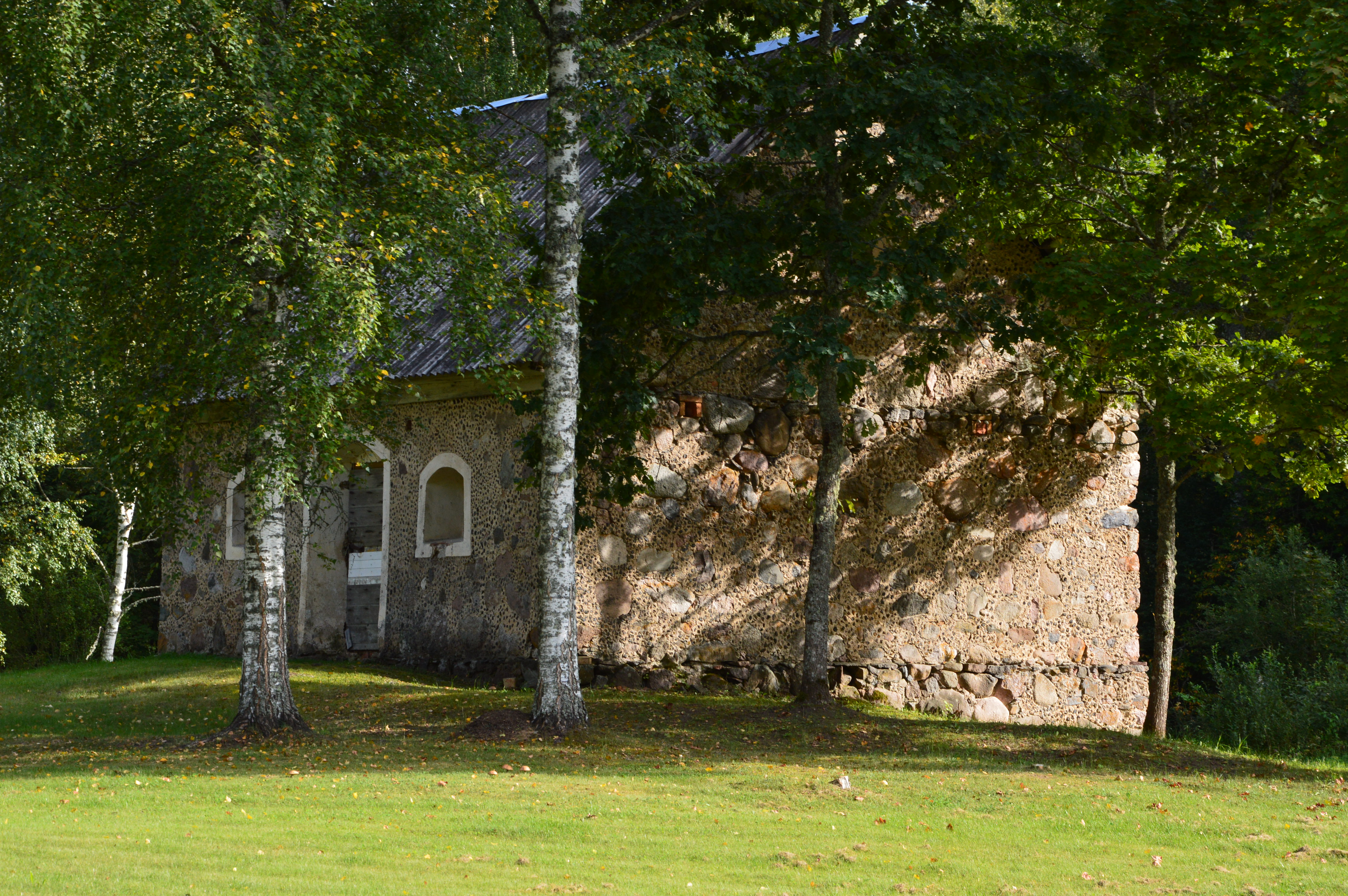
