= Vintri =

Village in Estonia

- Village
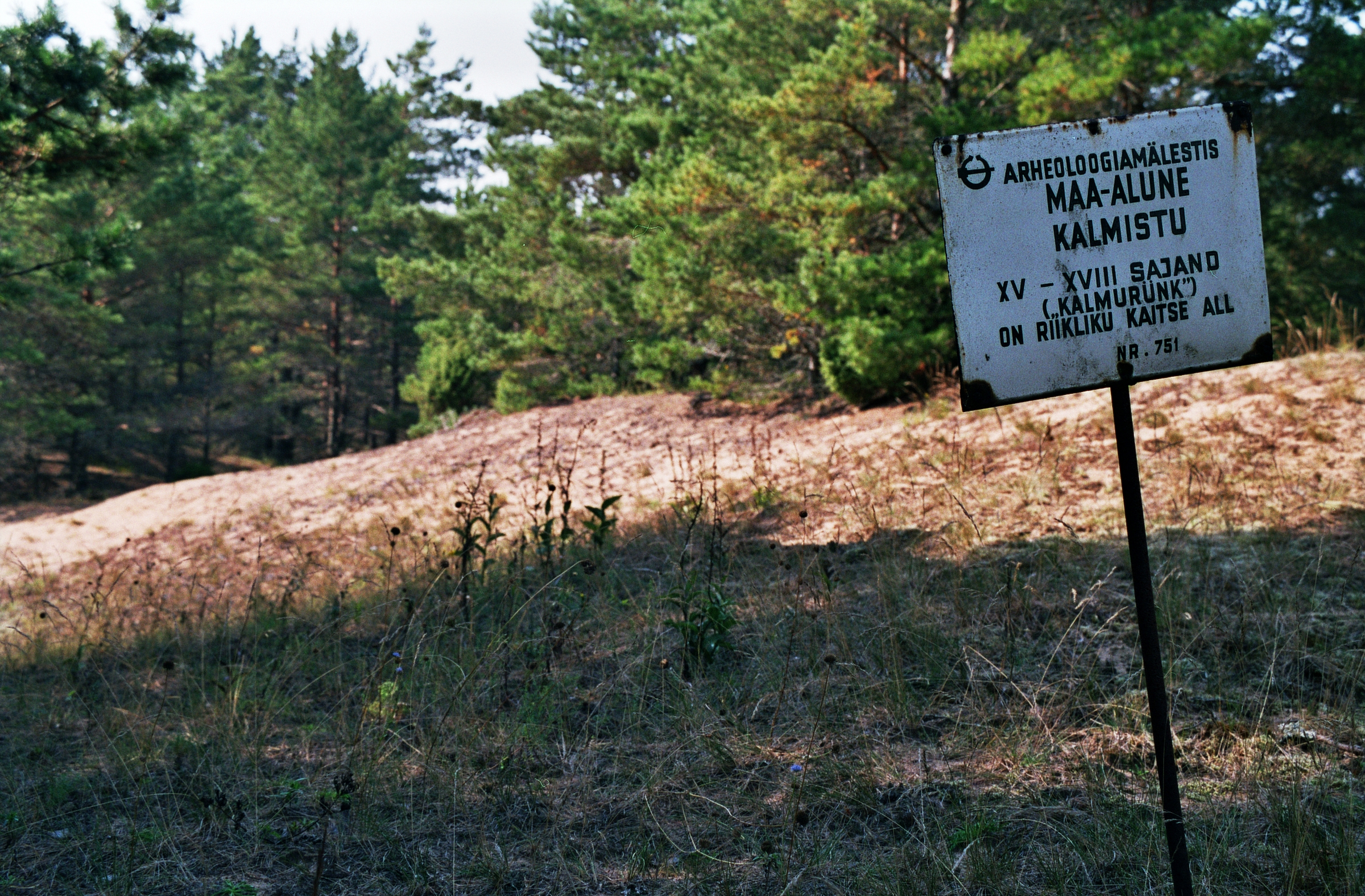
- Site of 15th-century cemetery in Vintri

- Location in Estonia
- Coordinates: 58°02′27″N 22°12′01″E
- Country: Estonia
- County: Saare County
- Municipality: Saaremaa Parish

Population (2011 Census)
  - Total: 18

Vintri is a village in Saaremaa Parish, Saare County, Estonia, on the island of Saaremaa. As of the 2011 census, the settlement's population was 18. Before the 2017 administrative reform in Estonia, the village belonged to Salme rural municipality.
