= Tiirimetsa =

Village in Estonia

- Village
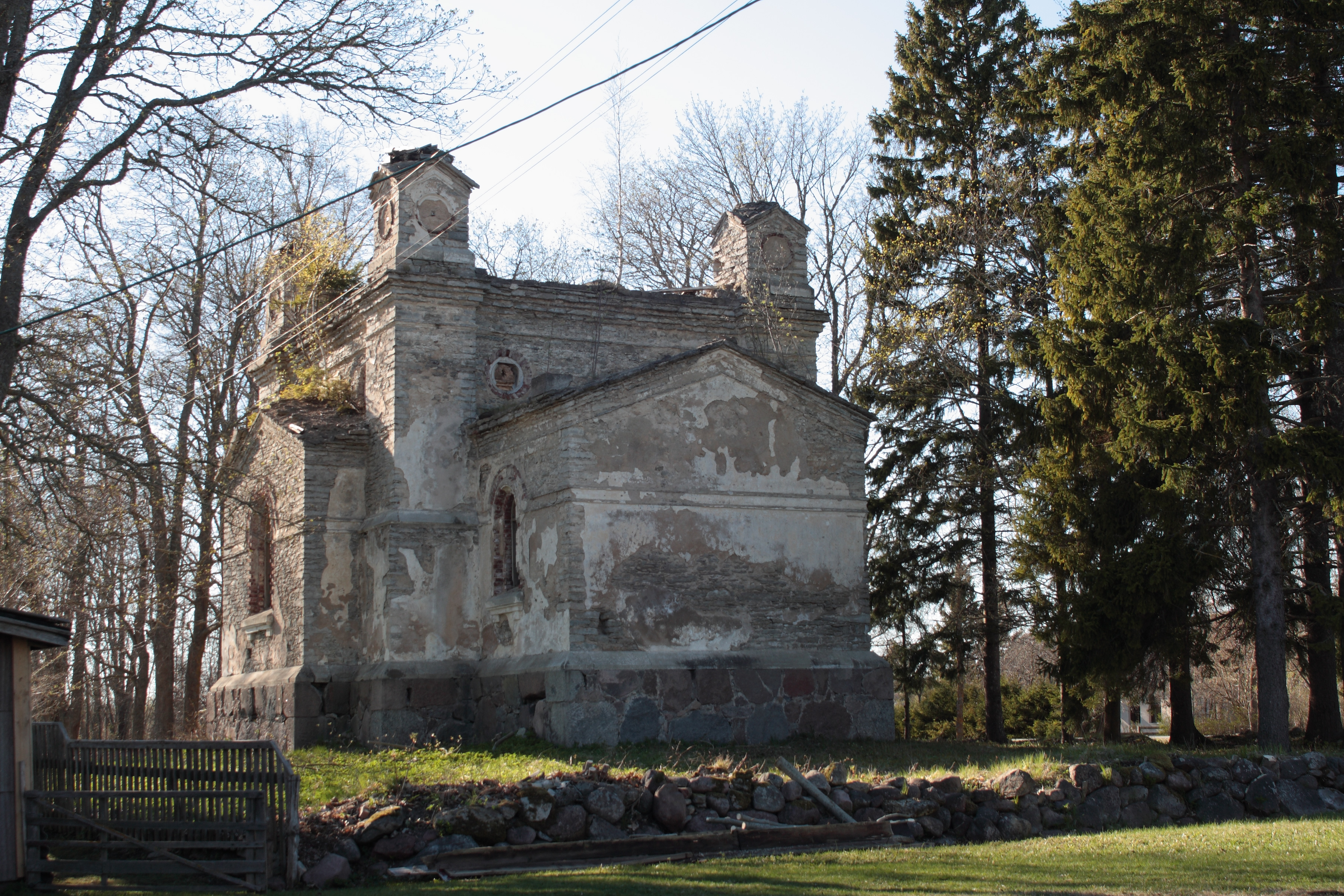
- Tiirimetsa Church of the Nativity.

- Location in Estonia
- Coordinates: 58°09′58″N 22°10′15″E
- Country: Estonia
- County: Saare County
- Municipality: Saaremaa Parish

Population (2011 Census)
  - Total: 50

Tiirimetsa is a village in Saaremaa Parish, Saare County, Estonia, on the island of Saaremaa. As of the 2011 census, the settlement's population was 50.

An Orthodox church called the Church of the Nativity was built in the 19th century but it has now fallen into ruin. A schoolhouse was built in the village in 1936 and it functioned as a school until 1988.

== See also ==
- Salme River
