= Laanemetsa =

Village in Estonia

- Village
- Location in Estonia
- Coordinates: 57°39′09″N 26°17′51″E
- Country: Estonia
- County: Valga County
- Municipality: Valga Parish

Population (2011 Census)
  - Total: 65

Laanemetsa (Võro: Lannamõtsa; German: Lannemetz) is a village in Valga Parish, Valga County in southeastern Estonia. As of the 2011 census, the settlement's population was 65.

== Gallery ==
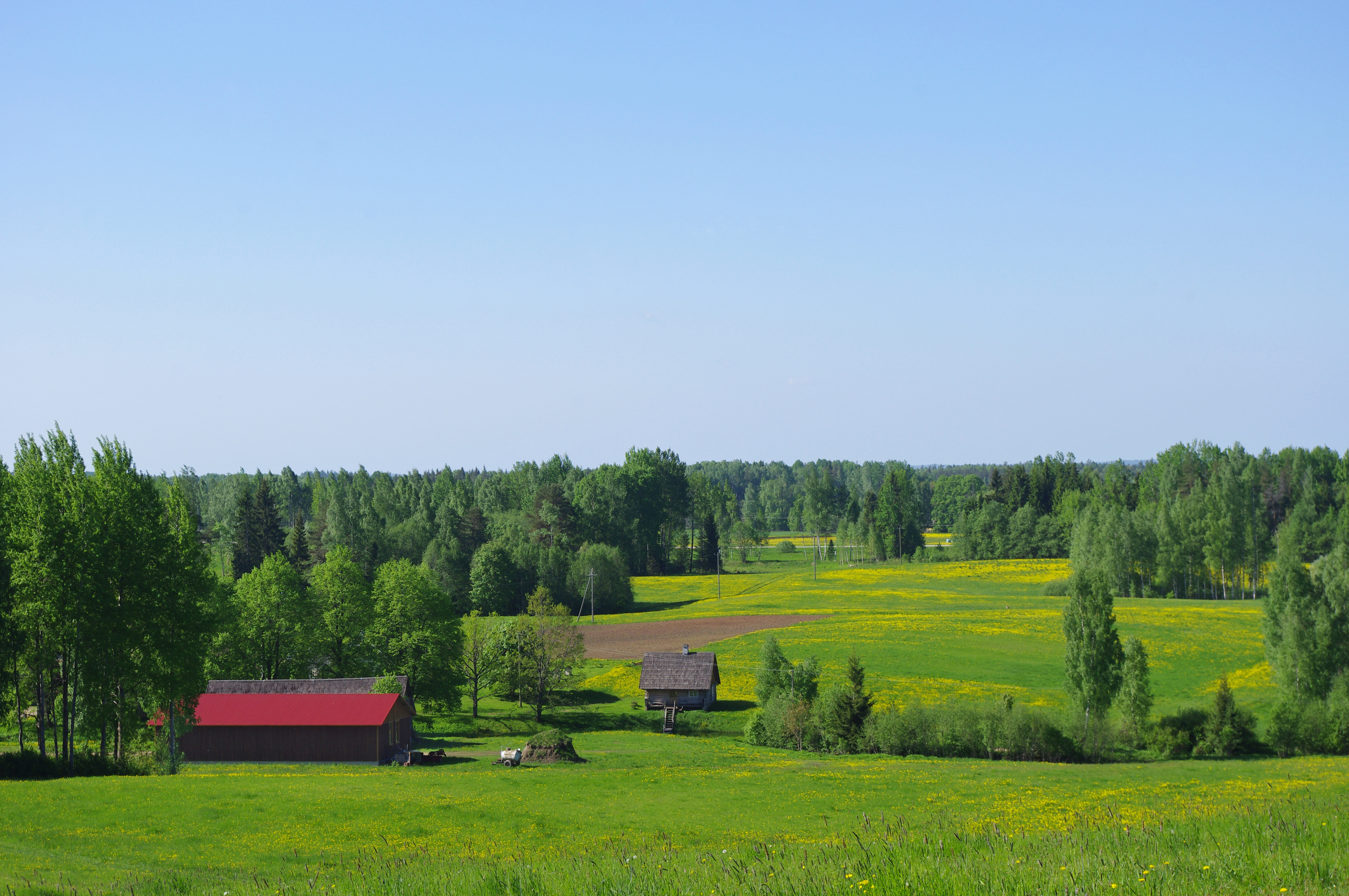

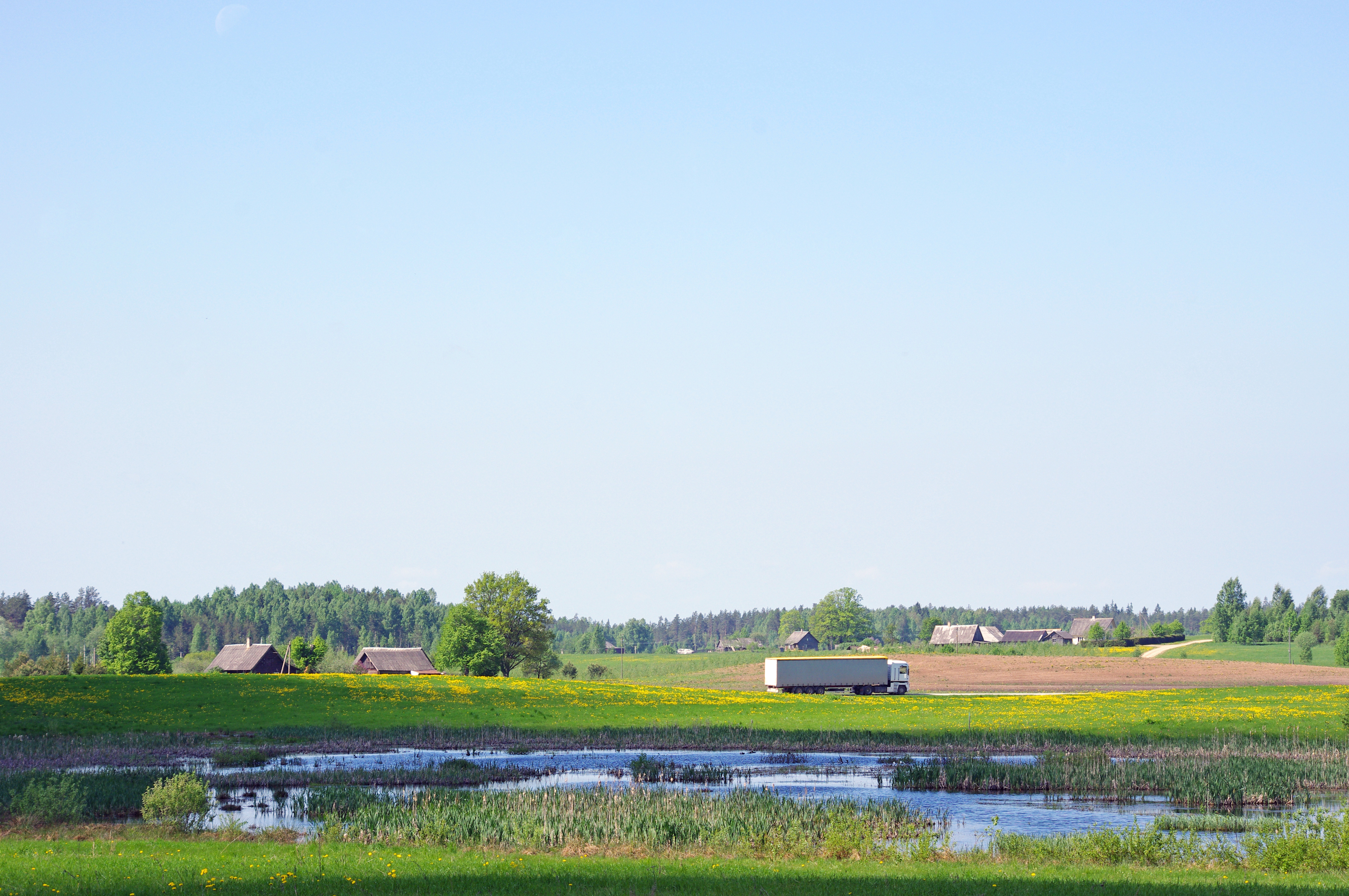

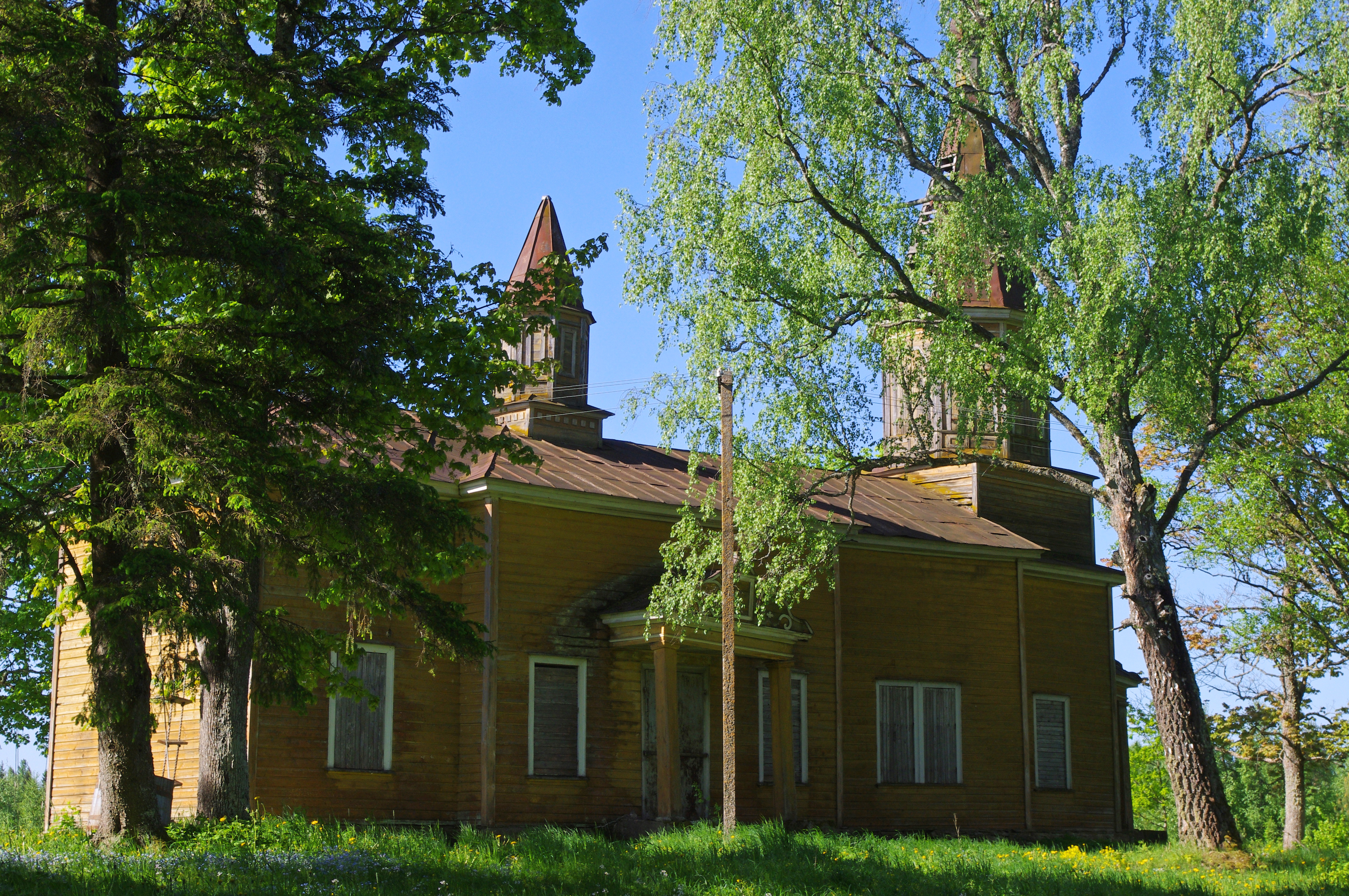
Laanemetsa church

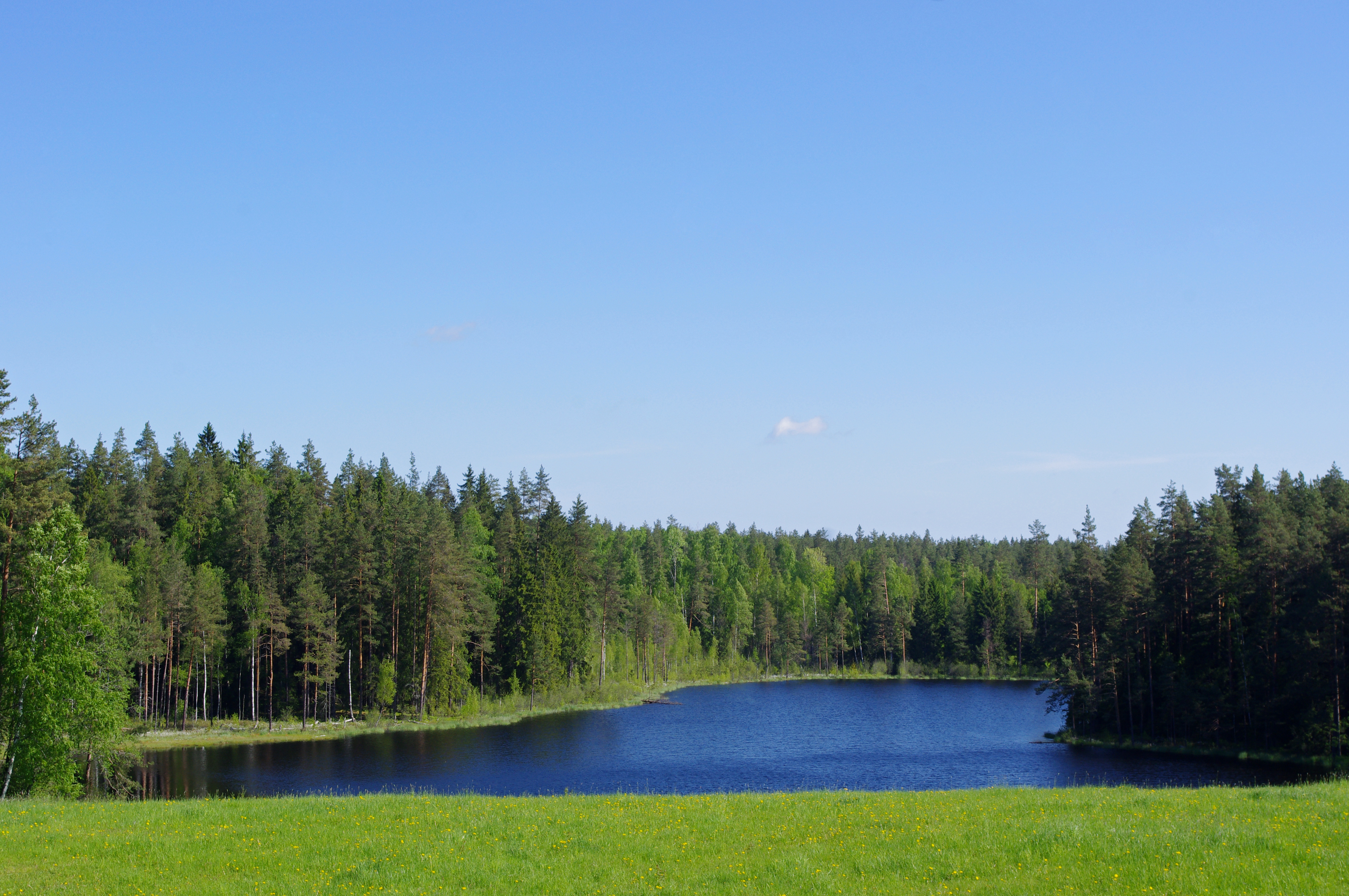
Lake Savijärv in Laanemetsa
