= Salme, Estonia =

Village in Estonia

- Small borough
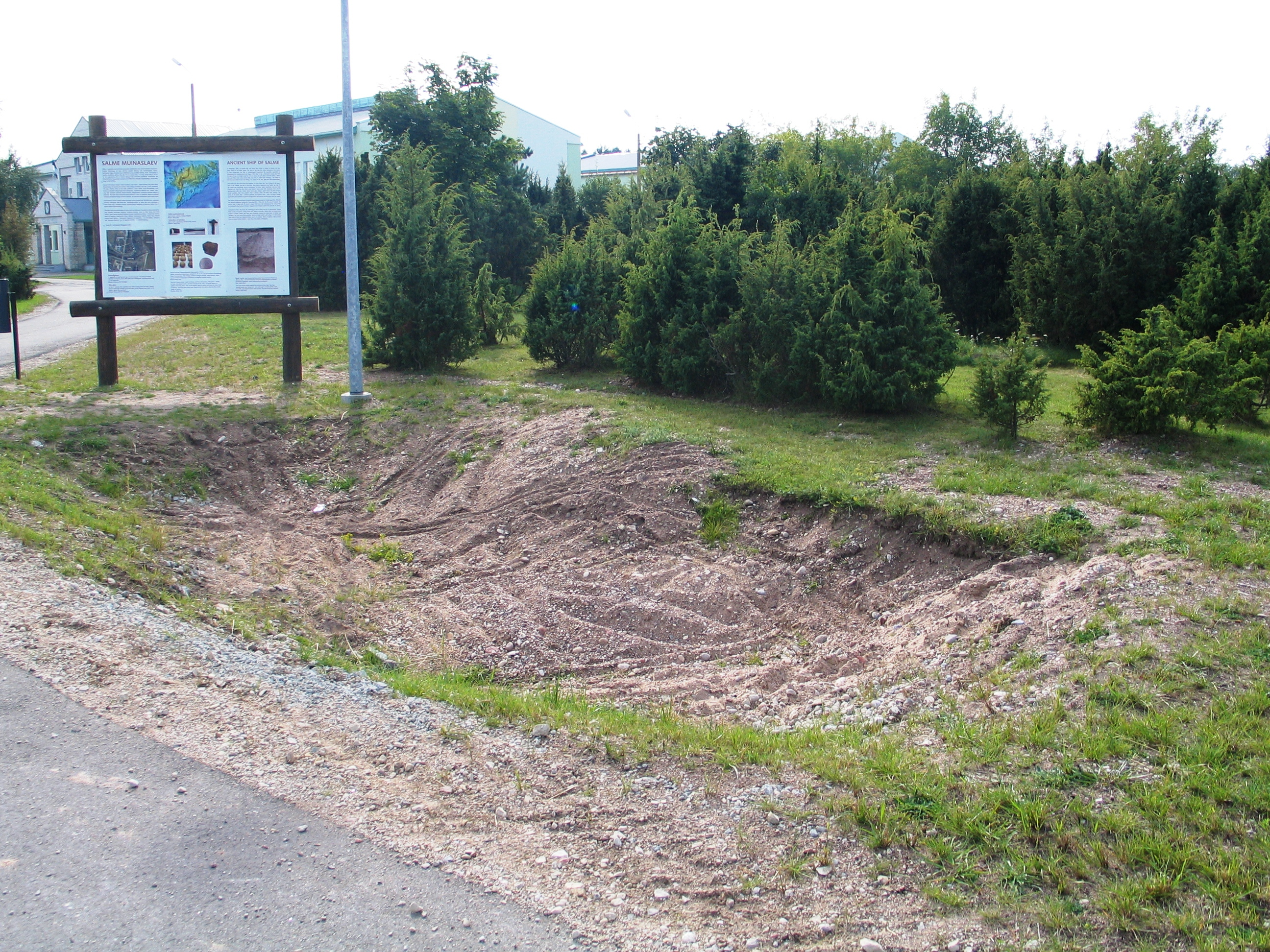
- An excavation site of one of the Salme ships

- Location within Estonia
- Coordinates: 58°10′N 22°16′E
- Country: Estonia
- County: Saare County
- Municipality: Saaremaa Parish

Area
  - Total: 1.8 km^{2} (0.69 sq mi)

Population (2021)
  - Total: 421
- Time zone: UTC+2 (EET)
  - Summer (DST): UTC+3 (EEST)

Salme is a small borough (Estonian: alevik) in Saaremaa Parish, Saare County in western Estonia. Prior to the administrative reform of Estonian municipalities in 2017, the village was the administrative center of Salme Parish.

The Salme shipfind consisted of two clinker-built ships discovered in Salme, one with the remains of seven persons found in autumn 2008, and another with 33 in 2010.

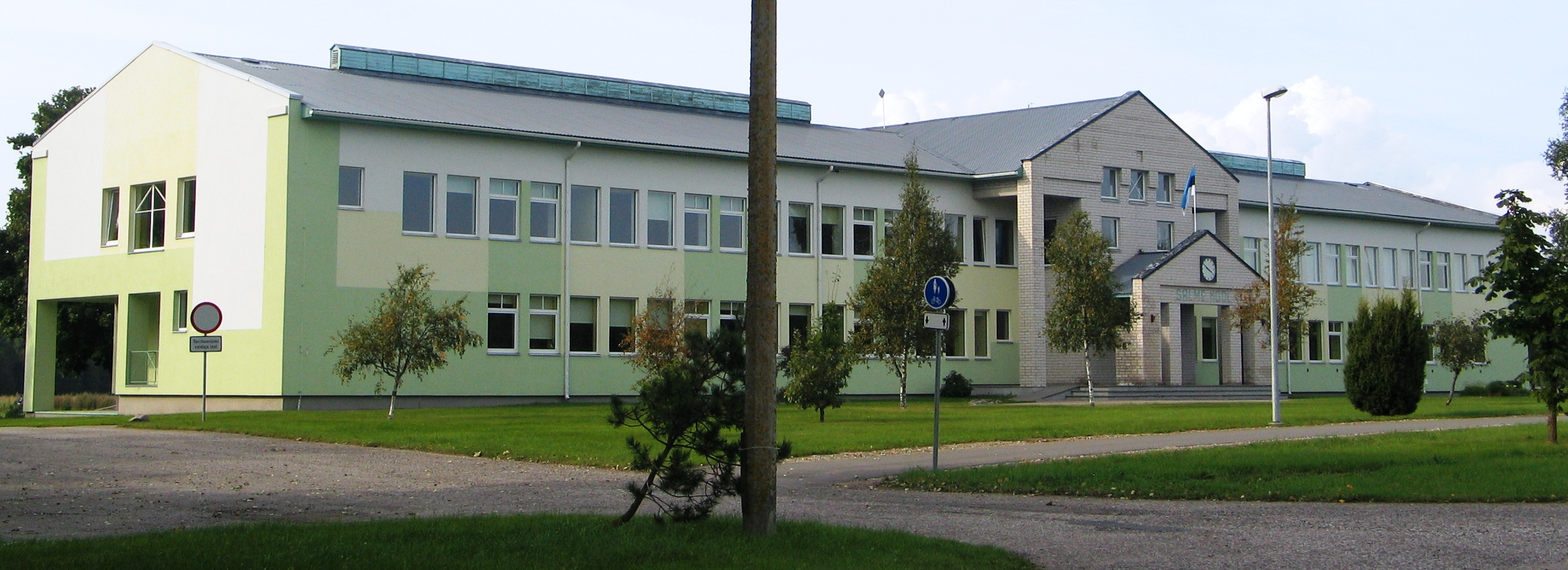
Salme school

As of 2021, the population of Salme was 421.
