= Moonsund operation =

Amphibious operation by the Red Army during World War II

Coordinates: 58°30′N 23°00′E

Moonsund landing operation
- Part of the Eastern Front of World War II
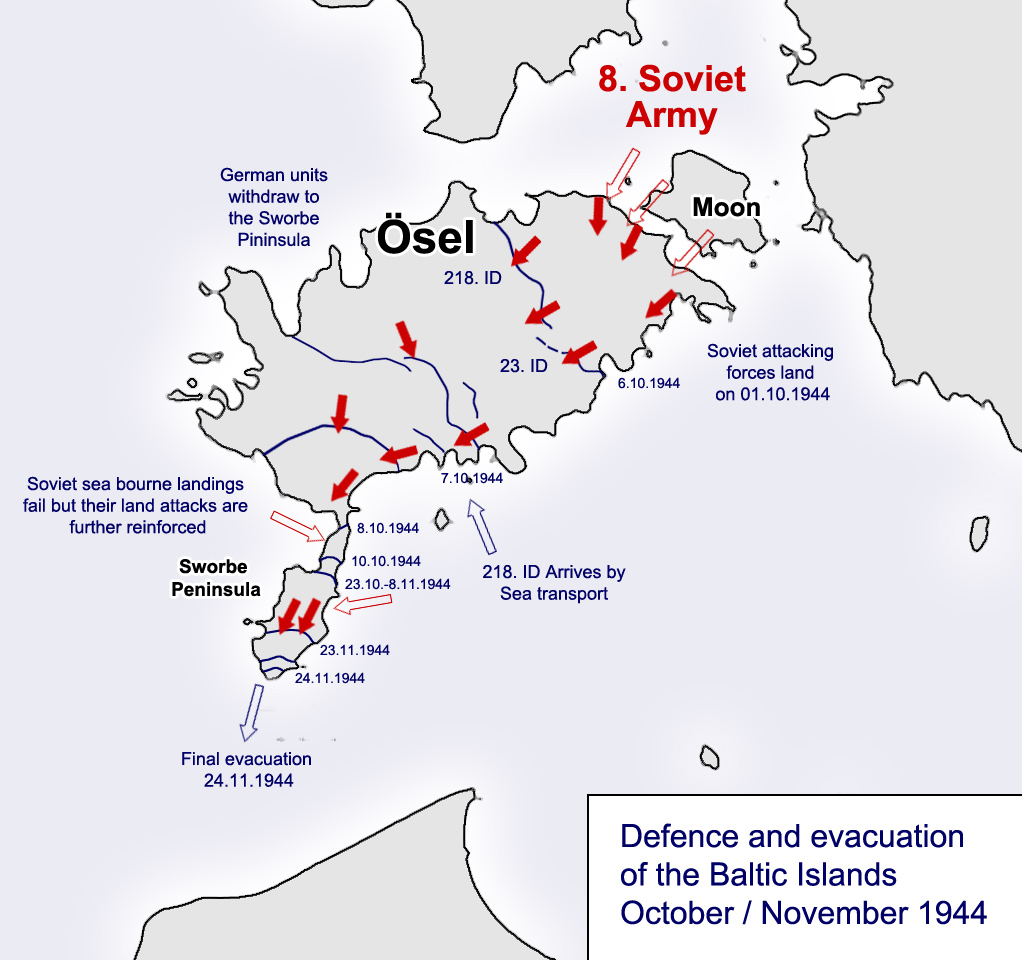
- A map depicting the fighting on Saaremaa island
Date	29 September 1944 – 24 November 1944
Location	West Estonian archipelago (Moonsund archipelago), Estonia
Result	Soviet victory

Belligerents
Germany	Soviet Union; Finland

Commanders and leaders
(Nazi Germany) Ferdinand Schörner	(Soviet Union) Leonid Govorov

Units involved
(Nazi Germany) Army Group North	(Soviet Union) Leningrad Front

Strength
18,000	Unknown

Casualties and losses
Unknown	Unknown

The Moonsund landing operation (Russian: Моонзундская десантная операция; Estonian: Lääne-Eesti saarte kaitsmine; Swedish: Moonsund Invasionen) was an amphibious operation and offensive by the Red Army during World War II, taking place in late 1944. It was part of the Baltic offensive, and was designed to clear German forces of Army Group North from the islands in East Baltic Sea, the West Estonian archipelago (Moonsund archipelago). The attacking forces were from the 8th Army of the Leningrad Front.

The Estonian islands were occupied largely by units of the German 23rd Infantry Division, which had been split across the three islands and reinforced with a variety of artillery, coastal artillery, and assault engineer detachments.

== Background ==
The islands of Saaremaa (Swedish and German: Ösel), Hiiumaa (Swedish and German: Dagö) and Muhu (Swedish and German: Moon) are the largest islands in the archipelago off the Northwest Estonian coast. They dominate the sea lanes to Helsinki, St. Petersburg (Leningrad), Tallinn (German: Reval) as well as the bay of Riga. They are almost completely flat, the highest point rising to about 68 metres above sea level. Most of the islands are covered in woods, marshes and fields also dominate the landscape. Much of the surrounding area of the Baltic Sea is shallow, making it unsuitable for major vessels.

The Soviet Union established garrisons on the island after the Soviet occupation of Estonia in 1940. In September–October 1941, after the German invasion of the Soviet Union, the islands were captured after German landings were launched from the Estonian west coast in Operation Beowulf.

== Soviet invasion ==
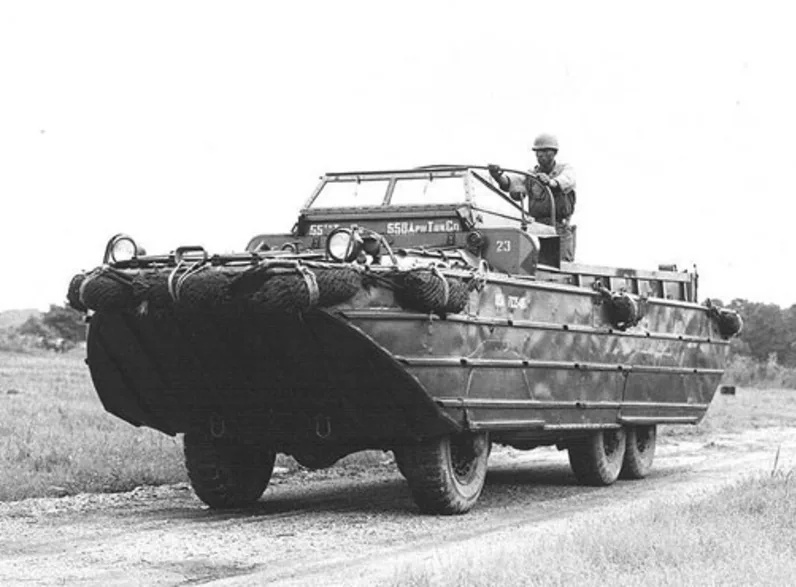
DUKW amphibious vehicle as used by Soviet forces in this operation

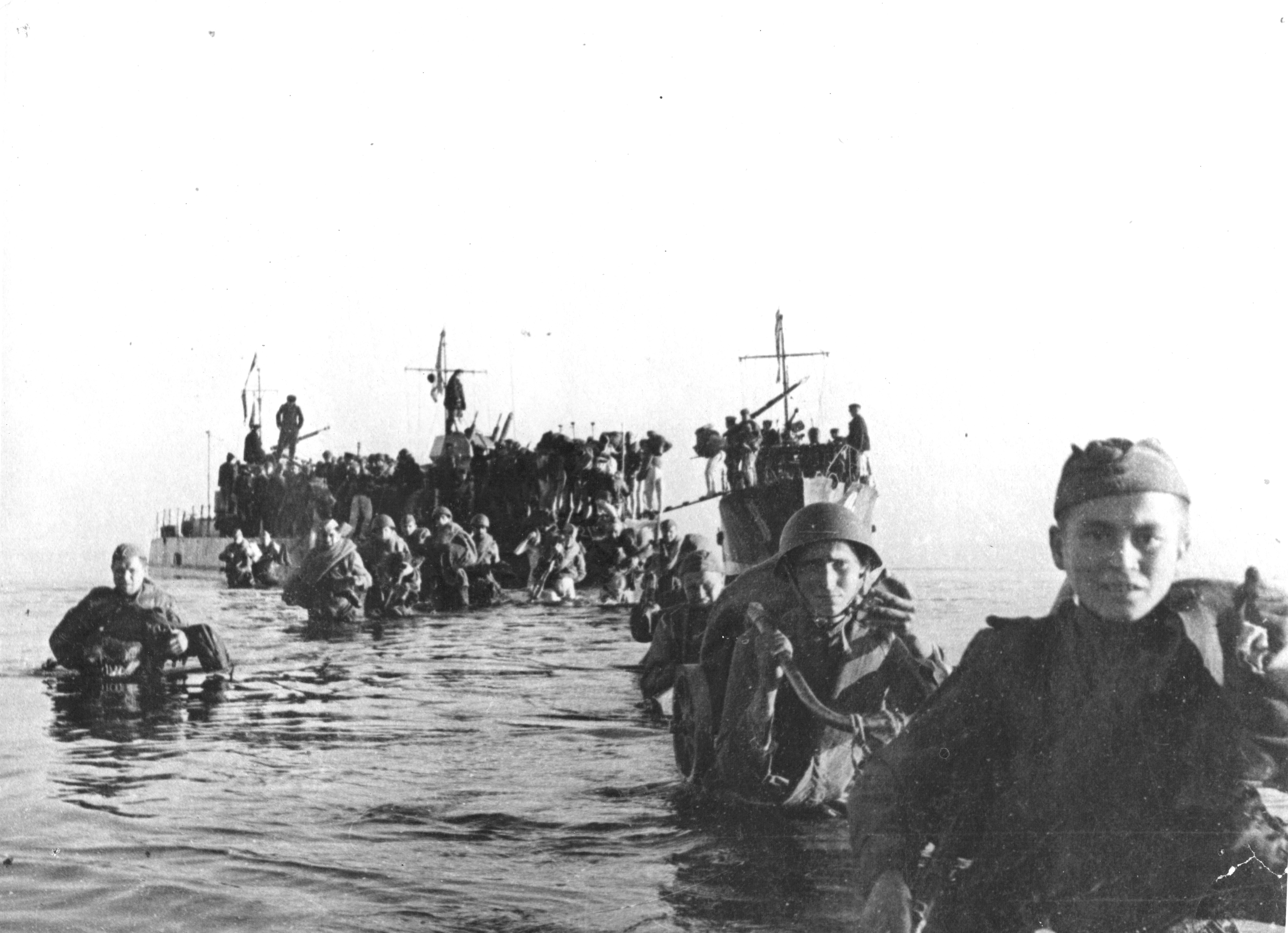
Troops of the 109th Rifle Division landing on Saaremaa, 14 October

The Red Army units assigned to the attack were the 8th Estonian Rifle Corps and 109th Rifle Corps. The troops were transported to the first beachhead at Kuivastu on Muhu Island using lend-lease landing craft, including amphibious DUKWs on 29 September 1944. Many of these troops were Estonians, most conscripted into the ranks of the advancing Red Army as was usual as the Soviets recaptured territories. While boosting the units' strength on paper, these untrained conscripts often had limited combat abilities. The Finnish detachment Arho took part in the operations, especially on 4 and 5 October, providing logistic support to the Soviet infantry units. The Allied controlling committee for Moscow's intermediate peace treaty between the Soviet Union and Finland had asked for 100 galeases and 100 motorboats with their Finnish crews, but Finland negotiated the number of vessels to half of what was asked, 50 galeases and 50 motorboats. There were a captain, a chief motor operator and two other crew members on every galeas and two crew members on every motorboat.

The Germans withdrew the garrison on Muhu after weak initial resistance, destroying the causeway between Muhu and Saaremaa; they also withdrew the forces on Hiiumaa to Saaremaa, landing the 218th Infantry Division and 12th Luftwaffe Field Division as further reinforcement. The Soviet plan had originally envisaged clearing the archipelago not later than 5 October but bad weather and German resistance interfered with their advance. After securing Hiiumaa, Soviet forces landed between Jaani and Keskvere in the north of Saaremaa on 5 October.

The German forces retreated across the island with occasional rearguard actions. They planned to make a stand at the narrow, more easily defensible Sõrve Peninsula on the southwestern side of Saaremaa. Several sharp engagements took place, most notably the Battle of Tehumardi, but by 8 October, all remaining German forces had been forced back to the peninsula. The rest of the island, including the city of Kuressaare (German: Arensburg), was now in Soviet hands, who reinforced their attacking units with the 30th Guards Rifle Corps.

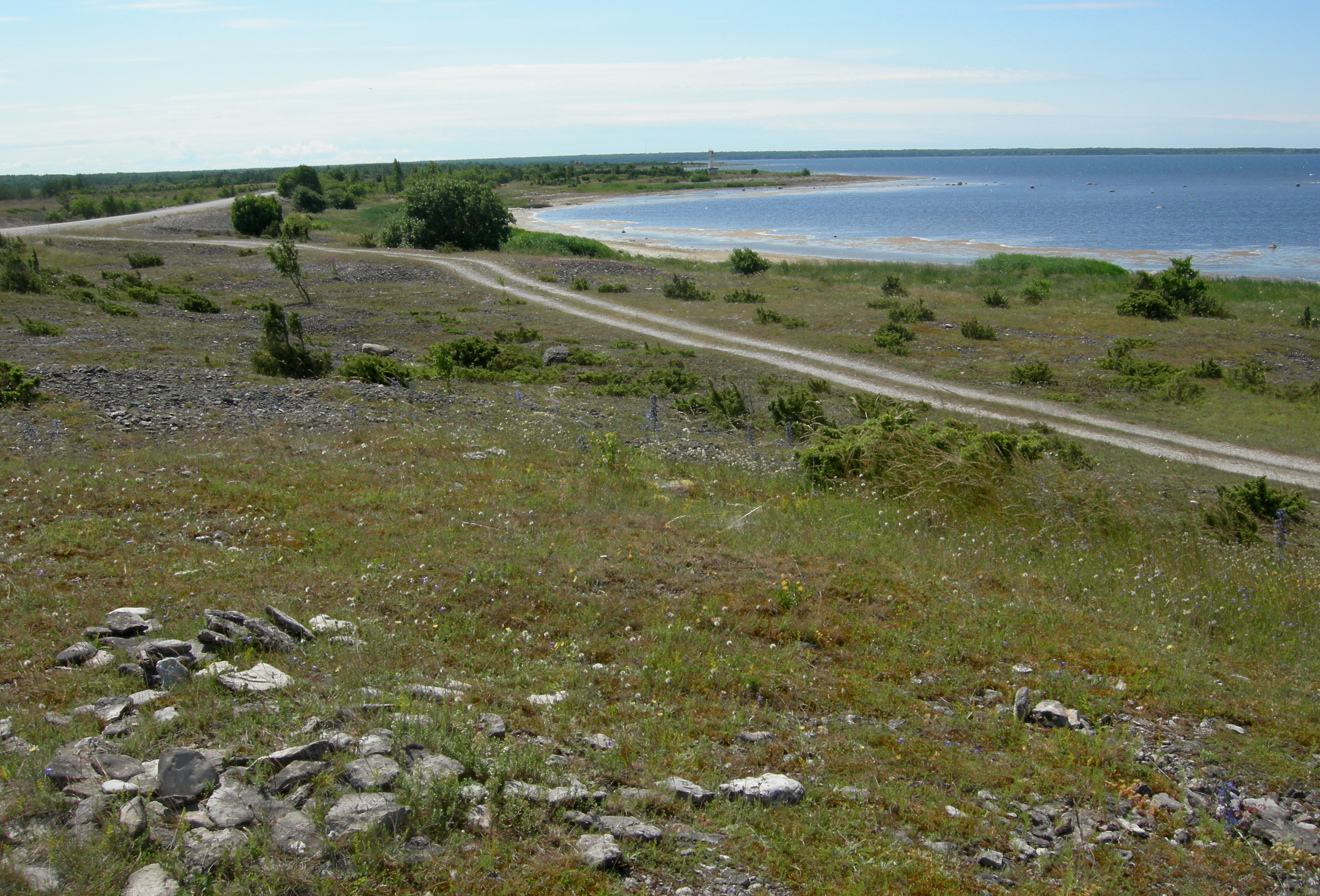
Beach used for Soviet amphibious attack, northwest Sõrve Peninsula

The Soviet attacks failed to make progress. The Germans had constructed solid defensive positions, built upon remnants of the Soviet positions from 1941. To provide an observation platform in the flat terrain, the Soviets launched two tethered observation balloons. From there, they were able to direct artillery fire against German positions and supply columns. The Soviets tried amphibious attacks behind the German lines but these were repulsed, inflicting severe losses on the attackers. A few days before the end of the battle, the Germans received effective naval gunfire support from flotillas, including the heavy cruisers Admiral Scheer and Prinz Eugen. The Soviets also had naval support, and there were minor clashes between the navies. After several weeks of fighting, the most powerful German formation, the 12th Luftwaffe Field Division was pulled back to Courland on 12 November, forcing the German units back to successive defensive lines.

The number of German combat losses reported in the Soviet literature is up to 7,000 killed and 700 prisoners of war.

== Withdrawal ==
As the tide of war turned against the Germans, Hitler increasingly forbade German forces to retreat, even from areas of dubious military value. The Germans clung to the island long after the main front had passed, removing its strategic and tactical value. As winter soon would set in with full force, the shallow waters in the archipelago would have frozen over as well, making it impossible for the weak forces to hold successfully.

By 23 November, the German defences had become untenable, and the Army Group commander, Ferdinand Schörner, gave the order to evacuate. This was contrary to an explicit order by Adolf Hitler to fight for the island to the last man. Although Schörner got away with this, most other commanders would probably have been removed from their posts. Whether this was because of his open Nazi sympathies or Hitler secretly realizing that he had done the right thing is unknown.

By the early hours of the 24th, all of the surviving German troops had been shipped out to Ventspils (German: Windau) on the embattled Courland peninsula by a naval force under the command of Major-General Karl Henke. They numbered about 4,500 men including 700 wounded, representing around 25% of the original force. Previous casualties had been evacuated earlier, along with Soviet prisoners and a large number of Estonian civilians not wanting to again be under Soviet rule. All remaining guns and vehicles were destroyed and left behind and 1,400 horses were shot, to prevent their use by the Soviets.

== Aftermath ==
The Soviet forces kept a large military presence on the island. Many of the old coastal artillery positions were rebuilt and modernized. The entire island of Saaremaa was declared a restricted zone and much of the territory was off-limits to civilians, including most of the Sõrve Peninsula. There was also a new wave of deportations in the late 1940s.

== In popular culture ==
- The operation is featured in the 2015 Estonian war drama 1944.

== See also ==
- Battle of Moon Sound (1917)
