= Thomas Salme =

Swedish aviator (born 1969)

- Born: February 18, 1969 (age 57); Stockholm, Sweden

Thomas Harry Salme (born 18 February 1969, in Stockholm) was convicted of flying passenger jets without a commercial pilot's license. After working as a First Officer and Captain from 1997 to 2010 for several international airline companies, Salme was arrested at Amsterdam's Schiphol Airport in March 2010.

== History ==
In 1997, Salme, who worked as a maintenance engineer for SAS, and had never flown a large aircraft, applied to the Italian airline company Air One to be a co-pilot, using false papers and a forged ID number, and was hired. He had learned to fly passenger jets using a flight simulator at Stockholm Arlanda Airport a friend gave him off-hours access to.

In 1999, he was promoted to captain and kept on working for Air One until 2006. He then moved to the Turkish-owned airline company Corendon Airlines, where he worked as a Captain for a year before being offered a contract at the British airline Jet2. After only ten months he decided to go back to work for Corendon, where he regularly flew passenger jets for another two years. Salme accumulated 10,000 hours in the air while flying without a valid commercial pilot's license.

Salme was arrested at Amsterdam's Schiphol Airport in March 2010, while seated in the cockpit of a Corendon Boeing 737 carrying 101 passengers just a few minutes before take-off to Ankara, Turkey. Officers, who were alerted by a tip from Swedish authorities, said the man had once had a private pilot license, but it had expired and it never qualified him for passenger flights. As a result, he was fined 2,000 Euros (£1,700 or $2,700) and was banned from flying for 12 months by a Dutch court, which rejected the prosecutor's request for a three-month suspended jail sentence.

Speaking through his lawyer, Salme said he had no plans to fly again. He wrote a book in Swedish about his experiences, En bluffpilots bekännelse ("Confessions of a Con Pilot"), published in 2012 by Norstedts förlag.

In the analysis of The Times, Salme's employer "bore part of the blame" because of its "laissez-faire approach to background checks". According to The Times and the South China Morning Post, this was one of a series of fake resume scandals as a result of which airlines and other employers tightened their vetting procedures concerning resume claims made by job applicants. Corendon Airlines tightened its vetting procedures for hiring pilots in the wake of this scandal.
