= Battle of Tehumardi =

1944 military conflict in Estonia during WW II

Coordinates: 58°10′35″N 22°15′00″E

The Battle of Tehumardi (Estonian: Tehumardi öölahing, Russian: Бой у Техумарди, German Schlacht von Tehumardi) was a battle on October 8, 1944, related to the Moonsund Operation during World War II. Soviet soldiers fought German troops occupying Tehumardi. It was one of the most brutal engagements during the fighting on the Estonian island of Saaremaa (Ösel) in 1944.

== Background ==
The Soviet Moonsund Landing Operation on 29 September 1944 had quickly gained ground. The smaller island of Muhu (Moon) was given up with little organized resistance, as was Hiiumaa (Dagö). On 5 October, the Soviets landed on Saaremaa. In a reversal of the fighting in 1941, the Germans conducted a quick fighting withdrawal, and planned to make a stand on the easily defendable peninsula of Sõrve (Sworbe).

== German forces ==
Two infantry battalions from the German 67th Potsdam Grenadier Regiment from the 23rd Infantry Division (Wehrmacht) had occupied a defensive position on the Nasva river, just west of the city of Kuressaare (Arensburg). They were a part of Kampfgruppe Eulenburg, most of which already had taken up positions on the Sõrve peninsula. The first and second battalions were commanded by Hauptmaenner (captains) H. Ulrichs and Klaus Ritter, respectively. Together, the reduced battalions mustered about 700–750 men. As they were unable to communicate with their parent unit and they felt increasingly isolated, towards midnight on the 8th the order was given to retreat to Sõrve.

== Soviet forces ==
Meanwhile, bypassing the German position on the Nasva, Soviet units moved south to occupy positions astride the main road leading to the peninsula. These were elements of the 307th anti-tank Battalion from the Estonian 249th Rifle Division, about 370 men commanded by Major V. Miller. Later that evening, they were joined by the 1st battalion of the 917th regiment, approximately 300 men commanded by Major G. Karaulnov, advancing down a secondary road leading to the small village of Tehumardi, right before the bottleneck of the peninsula. Many of the soldiers in the Soviet units were forcibly conscripted Estonians. Due to lack of reconnaissance, the Soviets were unaware of the withdrawing German units, and the stage was set for a confused night battle when the forces met head-on.

== The battle ==
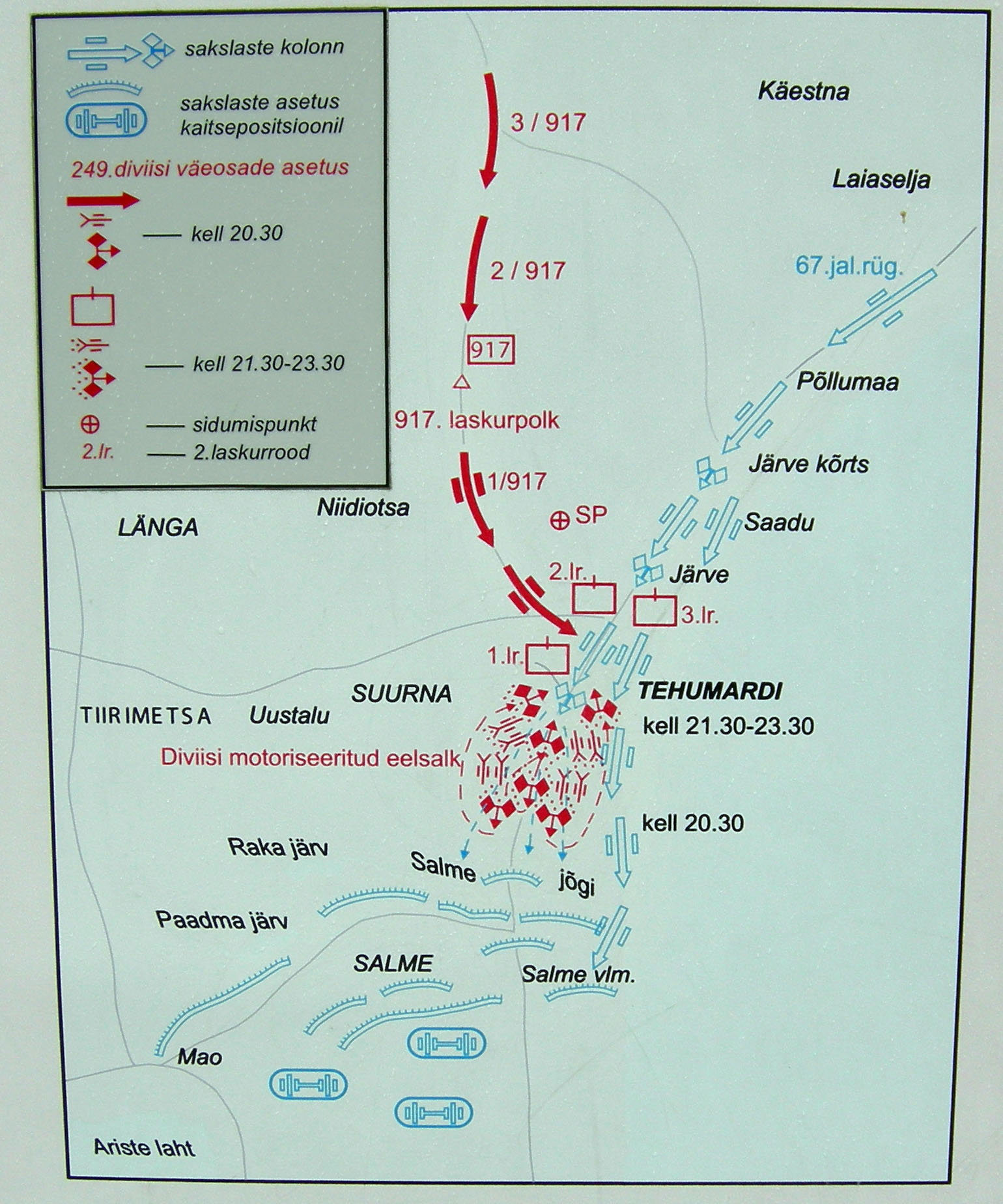
The battle. Germans in blue, Soviets in red.

The Germans' fear of being stragglers soon proved correct, as the only road already had been cratered by other withdrawing German units. Bypassing this obstacle took some time, the vehicles were slowly pulled across with the help of a recently captured US-made M3 Stuart light tank.

Suspecting an enemy presence, the soldiers were ordered to keep as silent as possible, breaking through the enemy positions with a sudden attack. The two battalions split up, the 1st moving along the waterline, the 2nd moving along the main road in parallel, about 200 m distant.

Soon the 2nd found themselves marching alongside a Soviet unit, who, believing them to be fellow Soviets, gave way. Flares fired gave the game away, and battle started.

The Soviets, the 1st battalion of the 917th was quickly overwhelmed, but the Germans then ran into the anti-tank positions of the 307th. The battle degenerated into chaotic hand-to-hand combat in the darkness, with heavy losses on both sides, but the Germans broke through. Their actions kept the Soviets occupied, however, and the 1st battalion moving along the waterline took no part in the fighting and suffered no losses.

== Aftermath ==
The majority of the Germans were able to break through to join the defence of the Sõrve peninsula, but almost 200 men had been lost. Captured German soldiers were shot, as happened consistently during the fighting on the island. Most of the vehicles were also left behind, including the light tank and a self-propelled FlaK gun. The Soviets also suffered about 200 men killed, with an unknown number of wounded. The killed included the commander, Major V. Miller. At least one tank and several guns were also knocked out.

The action delayed the Soviet attack on the peninsula, giving the Germans more time to improve their defences. But the hard-pressed German forces could ill afford losses in equipment and manpower at this stage of the war. After several weeks more of bitter fighting, the Sõrve peninsula, and thereby the entire island of Saaremaa, was evacuated by the Germans on the 23/24 November.

== After the war ==
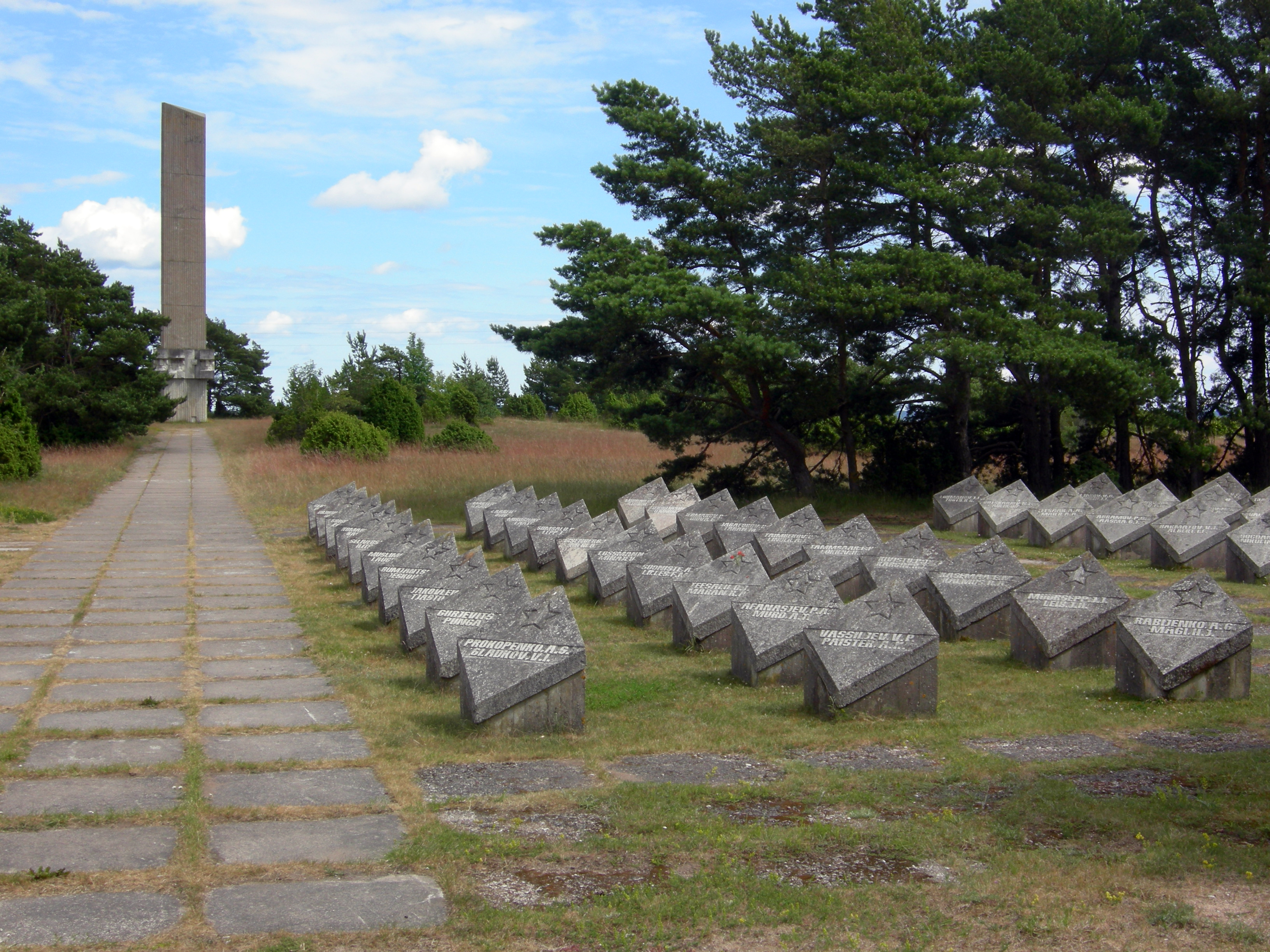
Tehumardi war memorial

To commemorate the battle, in 1967 the Soviets raised a gigantic, Soviet-style sword-shaped monument made of concrete and dolomite. Several massive concrete slabs with names of the fallen Soviets are mounted nearby.
