= Salme ships =

Scandinavian Iron-Age ships found in Estonia

Coordinates: 58°10′03″N 22°15′02″E

The Salme ships are two clinker-built ships of Scandinavian origin discovered in 2008 and 2010 near the village of Salme on the island of Saaremaa, Estonia. Both ships were used for ship burials around AD 700–750 in the Nordic Iron Age and contained the remains of 41 warriors killed in battle, as well as 6 dogs, 2 hunting hawks and numerous weapons and other artifacts.

== Discovery and excavation ==
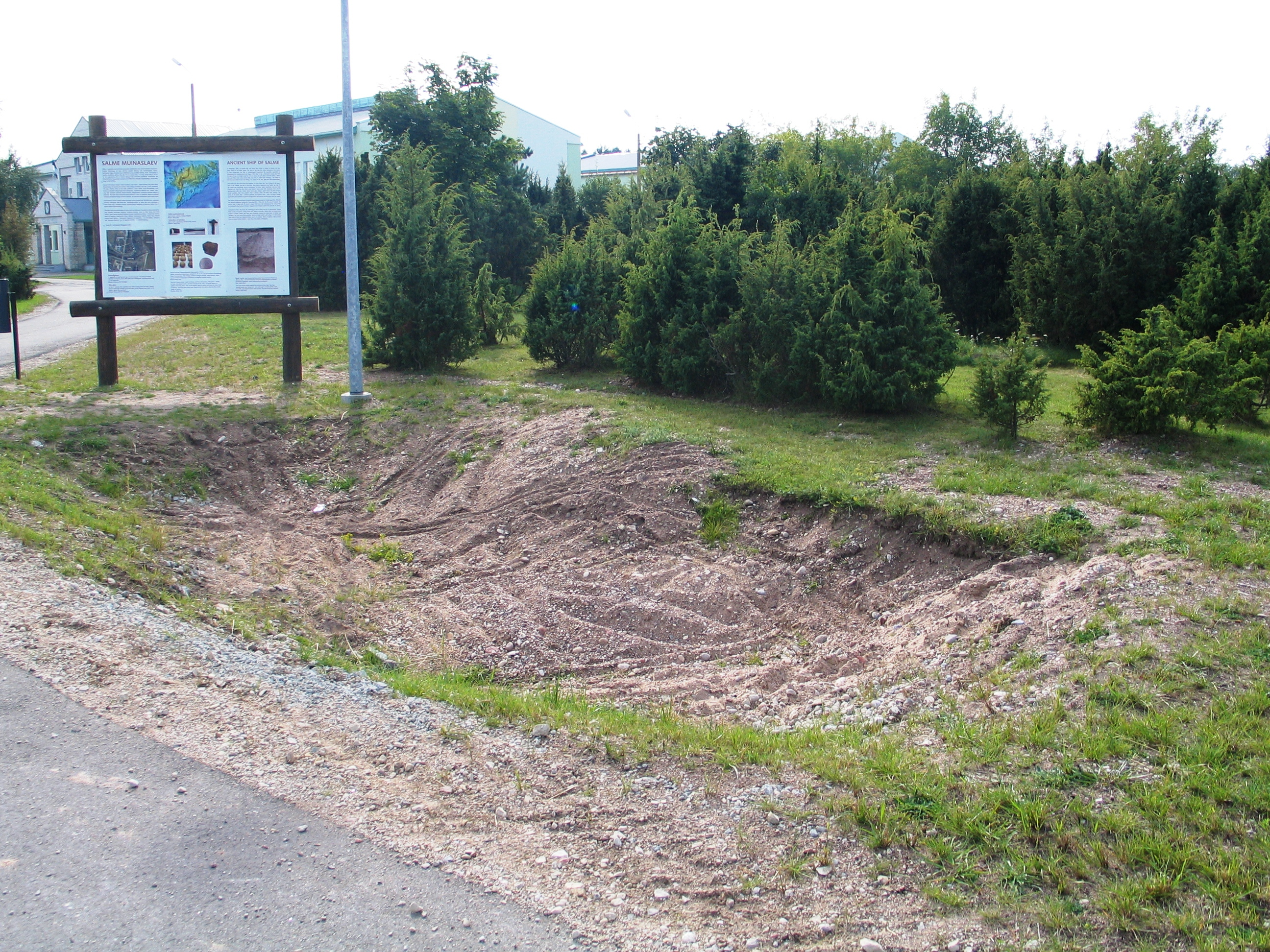
The site of one of the excavated Salme ships

The first ship was discovered in 2008 during earth removal for infrastructure construction. An archaeological expedition has been working on the site since 2008. The second ship was discovered in 2010. There is some indirect evidence pointing to the possibility that at least one more ship is yet to be discovered during future excavations.

=== Location ===
The ships were located near the ancient coastline, about 1.5 metres (5 ft) above water level. The location is 230 metres (250 yd) from the present coastline and 4 metres (13 ft) above present water level.

=== Description ===
Both Salme ships are clinker-built and archaeologists have estimated their time of construction to be AD 650–700, and the most likely site of construction in what is now Sweden. There are signs indicating they had been repaired and patched for decades before making their final voyage. One of the ships is 11.5 metres (38 ft) long and 2 metres (7 ft) wide, the second one more than 17 metres (56 ft) long and 3 metres (10 ft) wide. The outline of the keel of the larger vessel was preserved in humus, leading to the conclusion that it used a sail. In addition to the discovery of the keel, the irregular rows of strong rivets found on the bottom of the ship also indicate that the ship used sails. This makes it the oldest known vessel to use sails in the Baltic Sea region.

=== Human remains ===
Skeletal remains from at least 41 people were discovered in the two ships. Most of them belonged to 30–40-year-old men who had been killed in battle. Isotope analysis of some of the teeth, combined with the design of the buried artifacts, suggest that the men came from central Sweden. The smaller ship contained the skeletal remains of 7 people and there were at least 34 buried in four layers in the large ship. The skeletal remains from the smaller ship were scattered, this could have been because of plowing, World War II bombing or the dead had been sat up for the burial. Analyses of haplogroup testing identified the people as having the Y-chromosome haplogroup R1a1a1b, N1a1a1a1a1a1a, I1-M253 and mtDNA haplogroup T2b5a, V, J2a1a1a2, H10e, K1c1h, W6a, and U3b1b. The DNA analysis showed that four of the men were brothers and they were related to a fifth man, perhaps an uncle.

=== Grave goods ===
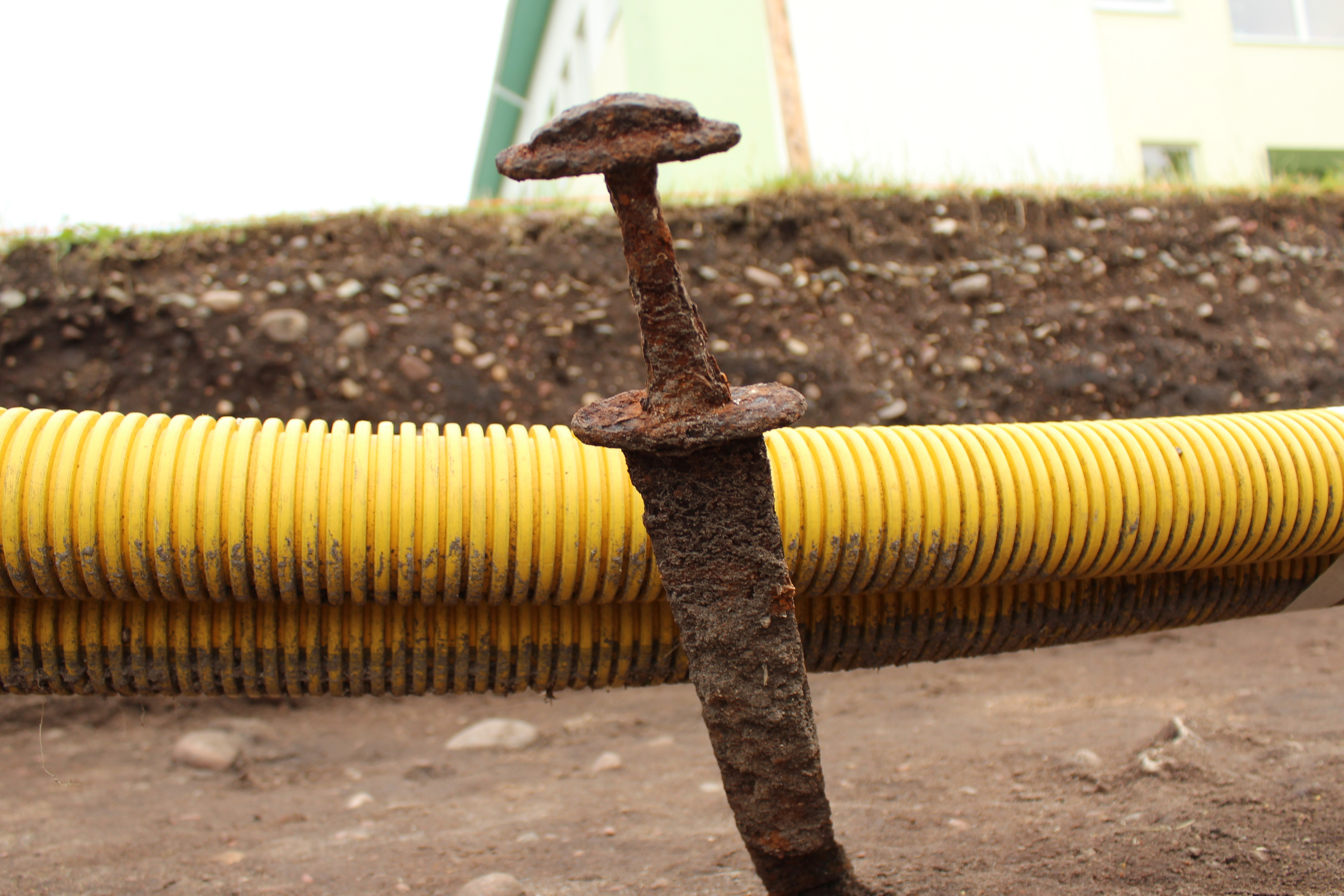
A sword from the 8th-century ship burial in Salme on the island of Saaremaa

Fragments of more than 40 swords of various types, remains of shields, spearheads and dozens of arrowheads were found in the burial. Most of them had been deliberately deformed, perhaps to discourage grave robbery.

Smaller objects included one small socketed axe, knives, whetstones, a bone comb with ornaments, a bear-claw necklace, and hundreds of gaming pieces made of whale bone and antler with six dice.

The skeletal remains of two ritually sacrificed dogs as well as hawks used for falconry were found in the burial.

== Interpretations ==
According to an early interpretation offered by Jüri Peets, the lead archaeologist at the site, the ships and the dead are of Scandinavian origin. According to the most likely scenario, a war party of Scandinavians attempted to carry out a raid against the Oeselians (Estonian inhabitants of the island of Saaremaa), but were attacked by Oeselian ships. The sides of the two ships contain numerous embedded arrowheads, some of which are of the three-pointed type used to carry burning materials to set enemy ships aflame. After losing too many oarsmen to the Estonian archers, the raiders pulled their ships aground and tried to defend themselves behind them. It appears that after the battle, the Oeselians allowed either the survivors or some other group of Scandinavians to ritually bury their dead. The burial is unusual because the ships were not covered with earth mounds. The site was eventually forgotten by the local inhabitants after it had become overblown by sand and covered with vegetation. The raid hypothesis has led to a questioning of when the Viking Age began exactly. The Salme event took place 50–100 years earlier than the infamous Viking raid on Lindisfarne in England in 793.

The original interpretation was called into question after the second, larger, ship was uncovered in 2010. It is likely that the human remains in it belonged to people of noble birth, as evidenced by the large number of expensive bronze sword-hilts and the complete lack of weaponry associated with commoners. The presence of dogs and hawks used for falconry indicates that the original purpose of the trip to Estonia may have been leisure or diplomacy. Peets suggests that the men may have come on a voyage from Sweden to forge an alliance or establish kinship ties when unknown parties set upon them.

=== Legendary background ===
In the 13th-century Ynglinga saga, written by Snorri Sturluson, it is said that the Swedish king Ingvar Harra, Östen's son, was a great warrior who often spent time patrolling the shores of his kingdom fighting Danes and Estonians. King Ingvar finally came to a peace agreement with the Danes and could take care of the Estonians. He consequently started pillaging in Estonia in retribution, and one summer he arrived at a place called Stein (see also Sveigder). The Estonians (sýslu kind) assembled a large army in the interior and attacked King Ingvar in a great battle. Their forces were too powerful and Ingvar fell and the Swedish forces retreated. Ingvar was buried in a mound at a place called Stone or Hill fort (at Steini) on the shores of Aðalsýsla, that is what is now mainland Estonia.

After this Snorri cites a verse from the 9th-century poem Ynglingatal:

Þat stǫkk upp,
at Yngvari
Sýslu kind
of sóit hafði.
Ok Ljósham
við lagar hjarta
herr eistneskr
at hilmi vá.
Ok austmarr
jǫfri sœnskum
Gymis ljóð
at gamni kveðr.

Translation: 'Word spread quickly, that the people of Sýsla had slain Yngvarr. And an Estonian force attacked the ruler, Ljóshamr ('the Light-skinned'), at the heart of the water [ISLAND]. And the Baltic sea sings the songs of Gymir <sea-giant> to the delight of the Swedish ruler.'

Edith Marold interprets the "heart of the water" (lagar hjarta) as a kenning for "island". The verse would then contradict Snorri (who says that Ingvar was buried on Aðalsýsla, the mainland), but give support to the association with Saaremaa.

Further proof for this interpretation is found in the genealogy of the Norwegian kings in the early 13th-century Historia Norwegiæ, which states that Ingvar died in expeditione occisus est in quadam insula Baltici maris, quæ ab indigenis Eysysla vocatur; "while campaigning on an island in the Baltic called Eysysla", Eysýsla being the Old Norse name for Saaremaa and the ancestor of modern Swedish Ösel, which is still the name used for the island in Swedish.

== Citations and references ==
=== Cited sources ===
- Andrew Curry (10 June 2013). "The First Vikings". Archaeology. the Archaeological Institute of America.
