= Kaugatoma Bay =

Bay in Estonia

Coordinates: 58.13°N 22.15°E

Kaugatoma Bay (Estonian: Kaugatoma laht) is bay in Saare County, Estonia.

Eastern-southern part of the bay is called as Ariste Bay and southern part as Lõu or Lõo Bay.

Several islets are located on the bay, e.g. Ooslamaa, Paasrahu, Võrkrahu.
