= 2011 Estonian census =

Census in Estonia

The 2011 Population and Housing Census (PHC 2011) (Estonian: Rahva ja eluruumide loendus (REL 2011)) was a census that was carried out during 31 December 2011 – 31 March 2012 in Estonia by Statistics Estonia.

The total population recorded was 1,294,455 persons, compared to 1,370,052 persons counted in the 2000 Estonian census.

== See also ==
- Demographics of Estonia
