= Saaremaa =

Largest island in Estonia

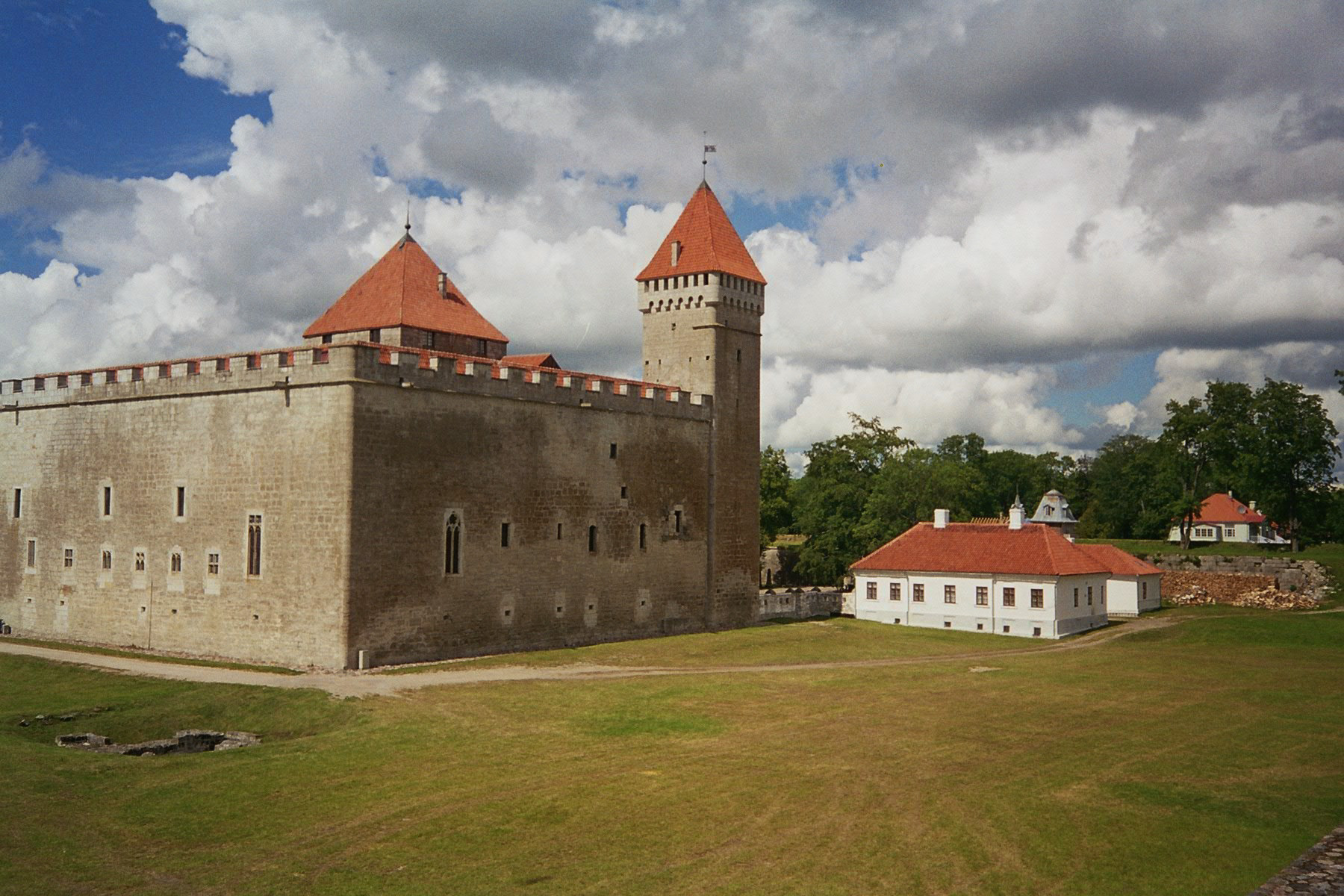
- Kuressaare Castle in Kuressaare

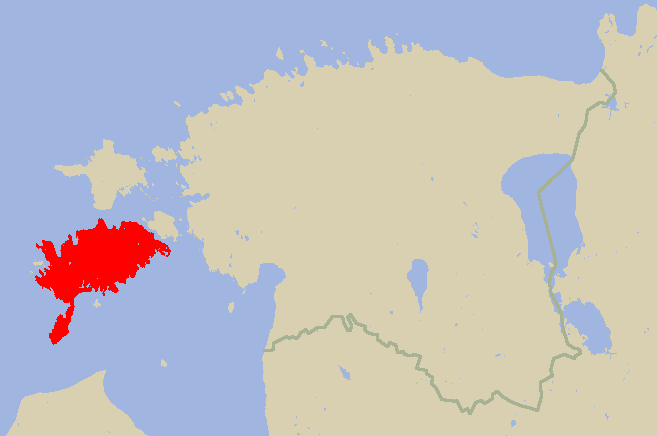
- Location of Saaremaa in Estonia

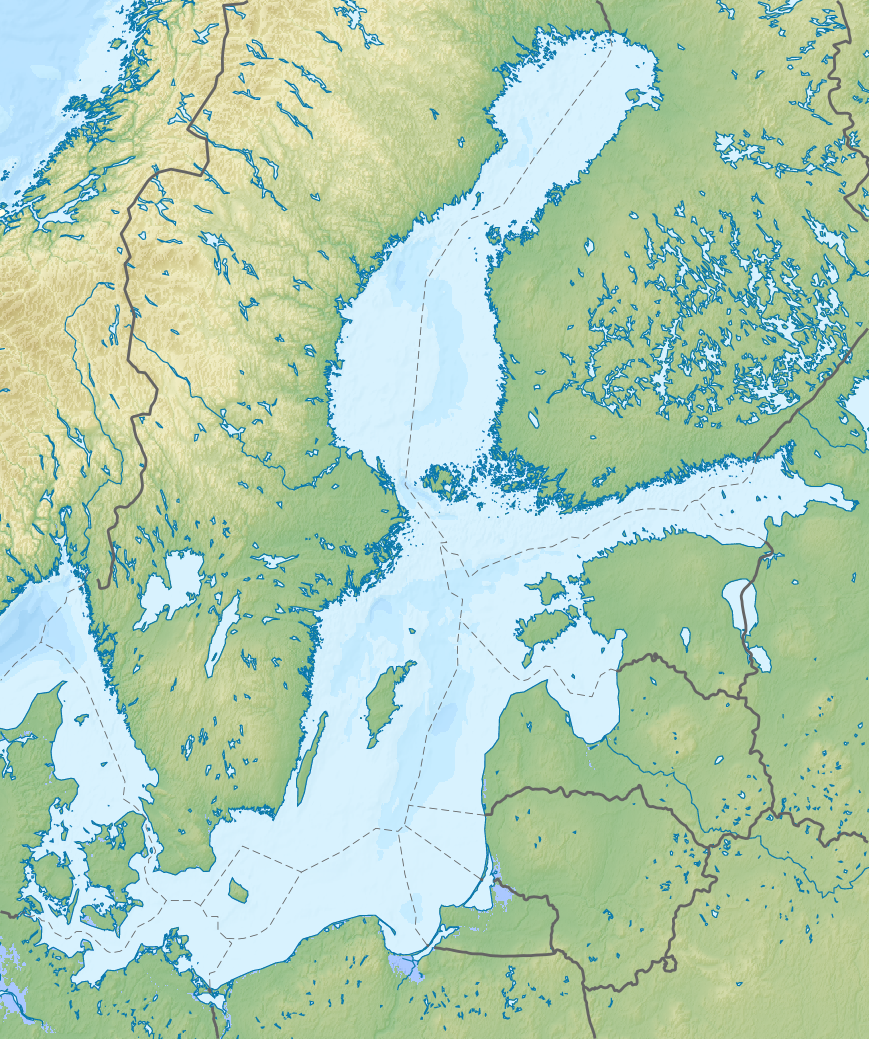
- Location within Europe Location within Baltic Sea region Location within Estonia

Geography
- Location: Baltic Sea
- Coordinates: 58°25′N 22°30′E
- Archipelago: West Estonian archipelago
- Area: 2,673 km^{2} (1,032 sq mi)

Administration
- Estonia
- County: Saare County

Demographics
- Population: 31,435 (January 2020)
- Pop. density: 11.7/km^{2} (30.3/sq mi)

Saaremaa (/ˈsɑːrəmɑː/; Estonian: [ˈsɑˑreˌmɑː]) is the largest and most populous island in Estonia. Measuring 2,673 km^{2} (1,032 sq mi), its population is 31,435 (as of January 2020). The main island of the West Estonian archipelago (Moonsund archipelago), it is located in the Baltic Sea, south of Hiiumaa island and northwest of the Gulf of Riga. The administrative centre of the island, and of the Saare maakond (county), is the town of Kuressaare.

From the 13th century until the first half of the 20th century, the island of Saaremaa was known in most of the world by variants of its other historical name Ösel.

== Etymology ==
Saaremaa was called Eysýsla in the Icelandic sagas and other early medieval Scandinavian sources (Old Norse: [ˈœyˌsyːslɑ], meaning 'the island district'), and named in contrast with Aðalsýsla ('the great district') or the Estonian mainland. The island is called Saaremaa in modern Estonian and Saarenmaa in Finnish—literally, 'land of the isle' or 'land of the island', that is, the same as the ancient Scandinavian name for the island.

The old Scandinavian name is also the origin of the island's name in Danish (Øsel), German and Swedish (Ösel), Gutnish (Oysl), and Latin (Osilia). In Latvian, the island is called Sāmsala, which possibly means 'the island of Saami'. Saaremaa may have been the historic Ultima Thule.

== History ==
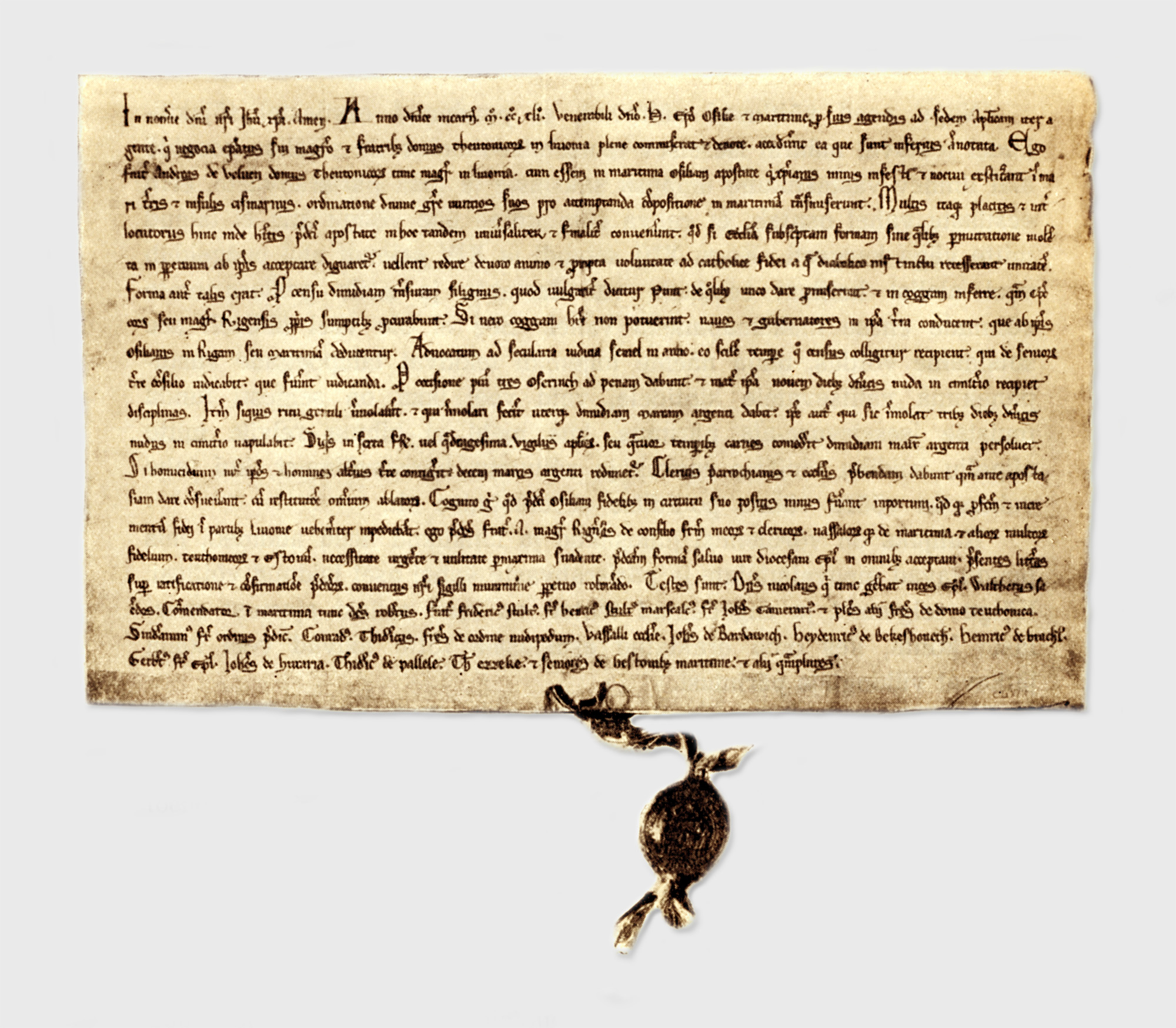
The 1241 Treaty between Livonian Order, Bishopric of Ösel–Wiek and Oeselians at National Archives of Sweden

According to archaeological finds, the territory of Saaremaa has been inhabited from at least 5000 BCE. Nordic Iron Age ship burials, dated to 700–750 CE, have been found in Sõrve Peninsula. Sagas talk about numerous skirmishes between the islanders and Vikings. Saaremaa was the wealthiest county of ancient Estonia and the home of notorious pirates, sometimes called the Eastern Vikings. The Chronicle of Henry of Livonia describes a fleet of sixteen ships and 500 Osilians ravaging the area that is now southern Sweden, then belonging to Denmark.

Probably around 1000, Gunnar Hámundarson from Iceland took part in a Viking raid at Eysýsla (Saaremaa). There he obtained his famous atgeir, by taking it from a man named Hallgrímur. Njáls saga tells the following:

Thence they held on south to Denmark and thence east to Smálönd and had victory wherever they went. They did not come back in autumn. The next summer they held on to Rafala (Tallinn) and fell in there with sea-rovers, and fought at once, and won the fight. After that they steered east to Eysýsla (Saaremaa) and lay there somewhile under a ness. There they saw a man coming down from the ness above them; Gunnar went on shore to meet the man, and they had a talk. Gunnar asked him his name, and he said it was Tófi. Gunnar asked again what he wanted. "Thee I want to see," says the man. "Two warships lie on the other side under the ness, and I will tell thee who command them: two brothers are the captains—one's name is Hallgrímur, and the other's Kolskeggur. I know them to be mighty men of war; and I know too that they have such good weapons that the like are not to be had. Hallgrímur has an atgeir which he had made by seething-spells; and this is what the spells say, that no weapon shall give him his death-blow save that atgeir. That thing follows it too that it is known at once when a man is to be slain with that atgeir, for something sings in it so loudly that it may be heard a long way off—such a strong nature has that atgeir in it.

The Chronicle of Henry of Livonia describes a fleet of sixteen ships and five hundred pirates from Saaremaa ravaging the area that is now southern Sweden, then belonging to Denmark. The XIVth book of Gesta Danorum, Saxo Grammaticus describes a subsequent battle on Öland in 1170 in which the Danish king Valdemar I mobilized his entire fleet to curb the incursions of pirates from "Couronia" (Courland) and Saaremaa.

Perhaps the most renowned raid by the inhabitants of Saaremaa occurred in 1187, with the attack on the Swedish town of Sigtuna (other candidates as raiders are Karelians and Curonians). Among the casualties of this raid was the Swedish archbishop Johannes. Archaeological excavations have not verified the traditions of destruction of the town. Normal life in Sigtuna continued until town started to slowly lose its importance during 13th century due to navigability problems caused by post-glacial rebound.

In 1227, Saaremaa was conquered by the Livonian Brothers of the Sword during the Livonian Crusade but the resistance of the local inhabitants remained strong. The crusaders founded the Bishopric of Ösel–Wiek there. When the Order was defeated by the Lithuanian army in the Battle of Saule in 1236, the Saaremaa islanders rebelled. The conflict was ended by a treaty that was signed by the Osilians and the Master of the Order. In the following year, the Sword-Brothers were absorbed into the Teutonic Order. As the crusaders' hold on Saaremaa got stronger, Christianity also became more established on the island, and to this day Saaremaa has a unique set of medieval churches in Kaarma, Karja, Kihelkonna, Muhu, Pöide, Püha and Valjala churches. The crusader's fortress Kuressaare Castle, known in German as Schloss Arensburg, was built by the Teutonic Order for the bishops of Ösel–Wiek (Estonian: Saare-Lääne). Construction began in 1380 and it is one of the most well-preserved medieval castles in Estonia and bears testimony to the late Medieval Age.

During the 14th–16th centuries, and possibly earlier, inhabitants of Saaremaa started to resettle into areas surrounding the Baltic Sea and, for example, to establish villages on the Livonian coast.

Most of Saaremaa was ruled directly by the Bishopric of Ösel–Wiek, while some parts were enfeoffed to the Livonian Order. In 1559, the bishopric and Saaremaa were sold to Denmark, becoming part of Danish Estonia. From 1570 until 1645 the entire island was under Danish possession.

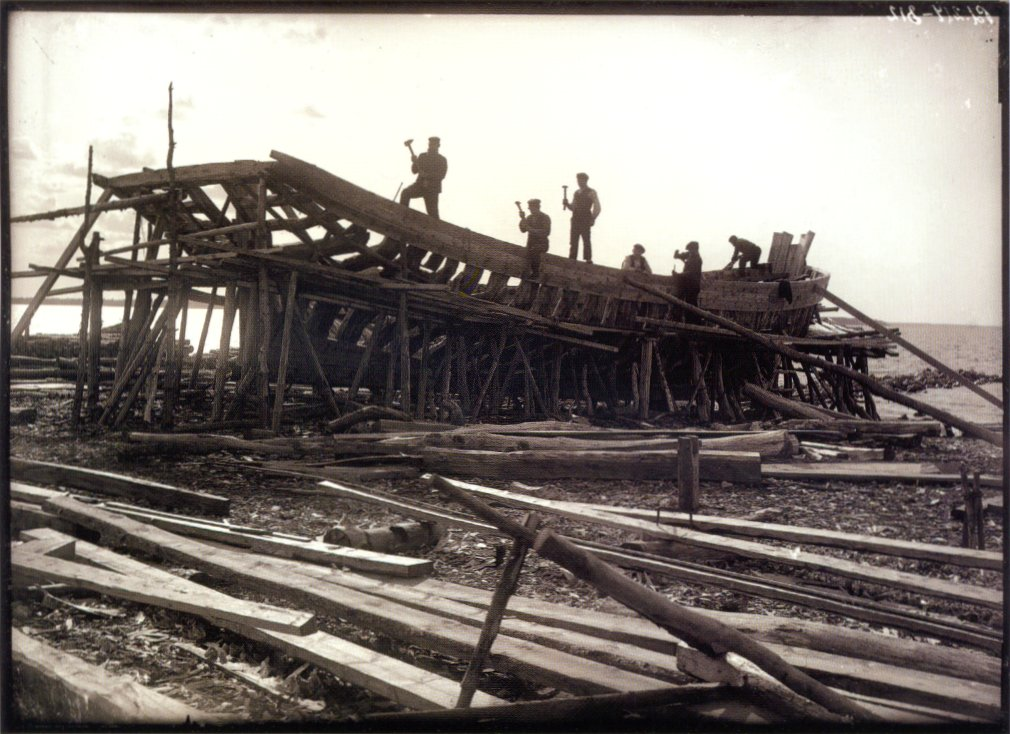
Local shipbuilders at work (Saaremaa, 1913)

In 1645, Saaremaa was ceded from Denmark–Norway to Sweden by the Treaty of Brömsebro. In 1721, along with the rest of Livonia, Saaremaa (then known by its Swedish name of Ösel) was ceded to the Russian Empire by the Treaty of Nystad, becoming a part of the Governorate of Livonia.

In 1840, the first spa opened in Kuressaare (then known as Arensburg), and the town experienced renaissance and became a popular seaside resort.

During World War I, the West Estonian Archipelago was conquered by Imperial German Army in October 1917 (Operation Albion) and remained occupied by Germans until the end of hostilities in November 1918. Thereafter Saaremaa became part of the newly independent Republic of Estonia. Most of the local Baltic German population of the island was resettled to Germany following the August 1939 Nazi–Soviet Pact. During World War II, the island was first occupied by the Soviet Red Army in June 1940 and, along with the rest of Estonian territory, formally annexed into the USSR in August 1940. On 8 August 1941, Soviet Naval Aviation started a bombing campaign on Berlin from Saaremaa, as shown in the 2022 film 1941: Wings Above Berlin. The island was then invaded and occupied by Nazi Germany later (Operation Beowulf). German troops were expelled and the island was reoccupied by the Soviet Red Army in the Moonsund Landing Operation in October and November 1944. In 1946, the Soviet military authorities declared Saaremaa a restricted zone closed to all non-local civilians, i.e., mainland Estonians and foreigners. It remained a restricted area until 1989. Estonia regained full independence in August 1991.

== Geography ==
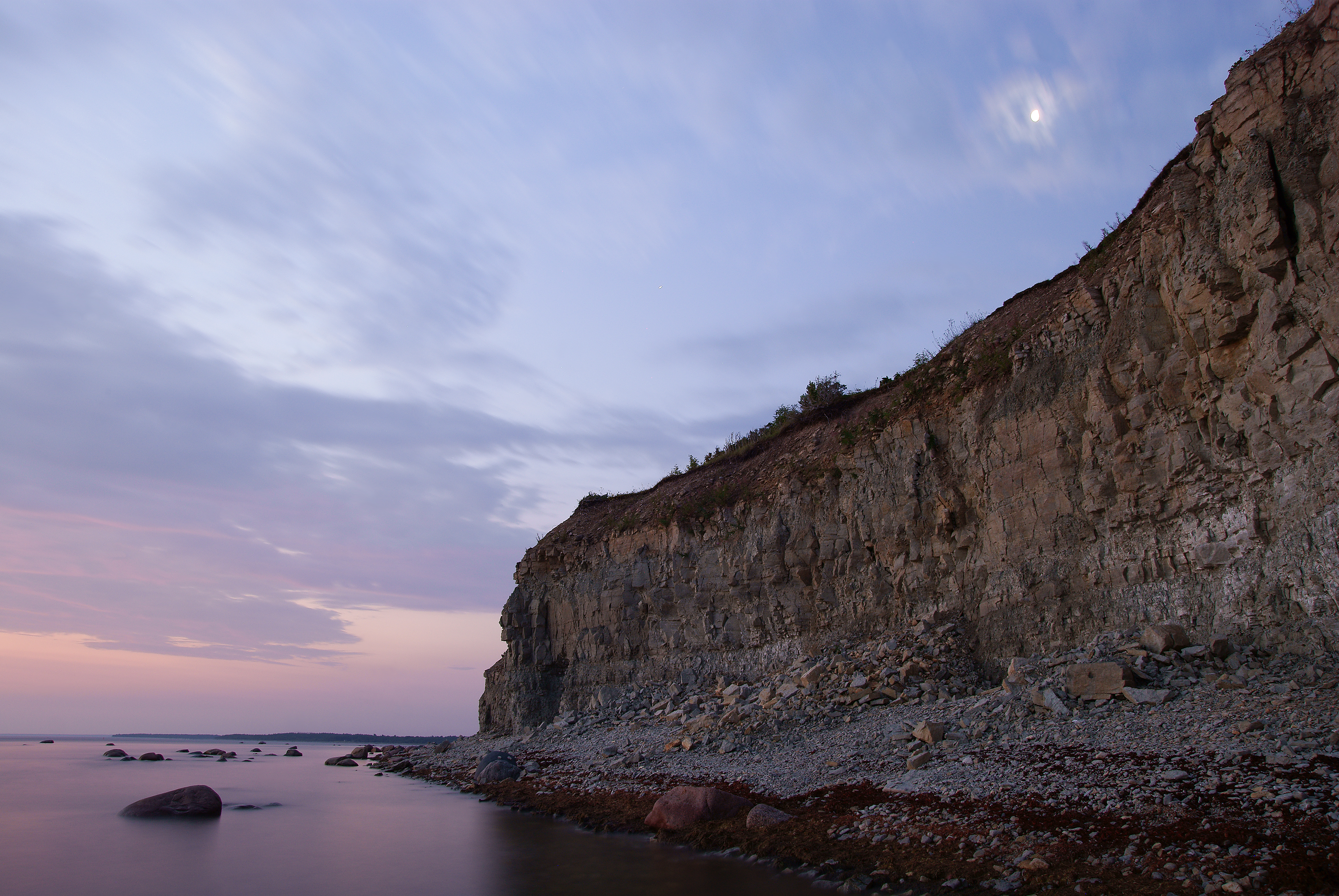
Panga Cliff

The island forms the main barrier between the Gulf of Riga and the Baltic Sea. To the south of it is the main passage out of the gulf, the Irbe Strait, next to Sõrve Peninsula, the southernmost portion of the island. In medieval times islanders crossed the strait to form fishing villages on the Livonian coast, notably Pitrags. In those days it was easier and quicker to cross the strait towards nearby Kolka, Saunags or Mazirbe, than travel by horse large distances inland. The highest point on the island is 54 m above sea level. The Kaali crater is on the island. The island has much forested terrain. One of the symbols of the island is the juniper.

=== Nature ===
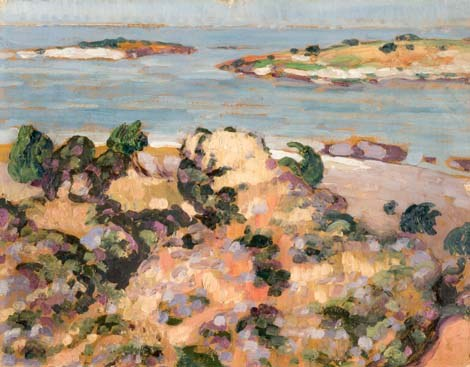
Shore of Saaremaa, by the Estonian artist Konrad Mägi (1913–1914)

More than 10,000 years ago, the first parts of Saaremaa emerged from the Baltic Ice Lake. The uplift of the Earth's crust continues today, at a rate of 2 mm (0.079 in) per year. The West Estonian islands are low-lying plains resting on limestone; their average elevation is roughly 15 meters (49 ft) above sea level. Limestone has become denuded in many places, resulting in cliffs, limestone pits and quarries at Mustjala, Ninase, Pulli, Üügu and Kaugatuma.

Because of its mild maritime climate and a variety of soils, Saaremaa has a rich flora, illustrated by the fact that 80% of the plant species found in Estonia are represented here. Altogether 1200 species of vascular plants can be found in Saaremaa. About 120 of the local plant species are rare ones that have received special protection status. The most famous endemic species is Rhinanthus osiliensis, a rare little flower growing mostly in spring fens. Rare and beautiful flowers are widespread; out of the 36 species found in Estonia, 35 of them are found on Saaremaa and its adjacent islands.

Over 40% of Saaremaa is covered with forests, most of which are mixed forests, but in some areas, one can find broad-leaved (deciduous) trees, which are relicts of plant communities of former milder climatic periods. Wooded meadows were common in Saaremaa before World War II, but many of these unique natural complexes have gradually become overgrown and thus converted into the ordinary forest. The same is true for alvars (limestone areas covered with thin soil and stunted vegetation). Once a typical and exclusive landscape element in Saaremaa alvars are now in decline. Nature conservation planning for Saaremaa now includes protection of the largest and most unusual alvar areas.

Saaremaa has a wide variety of rare wildlife species, ranging from insects to seals. The smallest protected wildlife species in terms of size include the clouded apollo butterflies and Roman snails.

The coastal areas of Saaremaa are well-known seal habitats; in fact, the indigenous gray seal can be found in three large permanent resting areas on the islets off the coast in the western and southern parts of Saaremaa. Nowadays, the local population of said seals is slightly increasing. Ringed seals can be encountered everywhere in the coastal waters of Saaremaa but, because of their timidity, it has not been possible to make an estimation of their number.

The islands lie in the East Atlantic Flyway, a migration route of waterfowl. This "bird road" connects northeastern Europe with Arctic regions. Each year hundreds of thousands of migratory birds visit Saaremaa in spring and autumn. The barnacle goose, mute swan, whooper swan, eider, shelduck and a great many other bird species have been given protection status. But on the whole, the islands are somewhat poorer in wildlife species than the mainland. Neither mole, mink, nor otter can be found here, whilst the Eurasian lynx and the brown bear are infrequent guests.

=== Kaali Meteorite ===
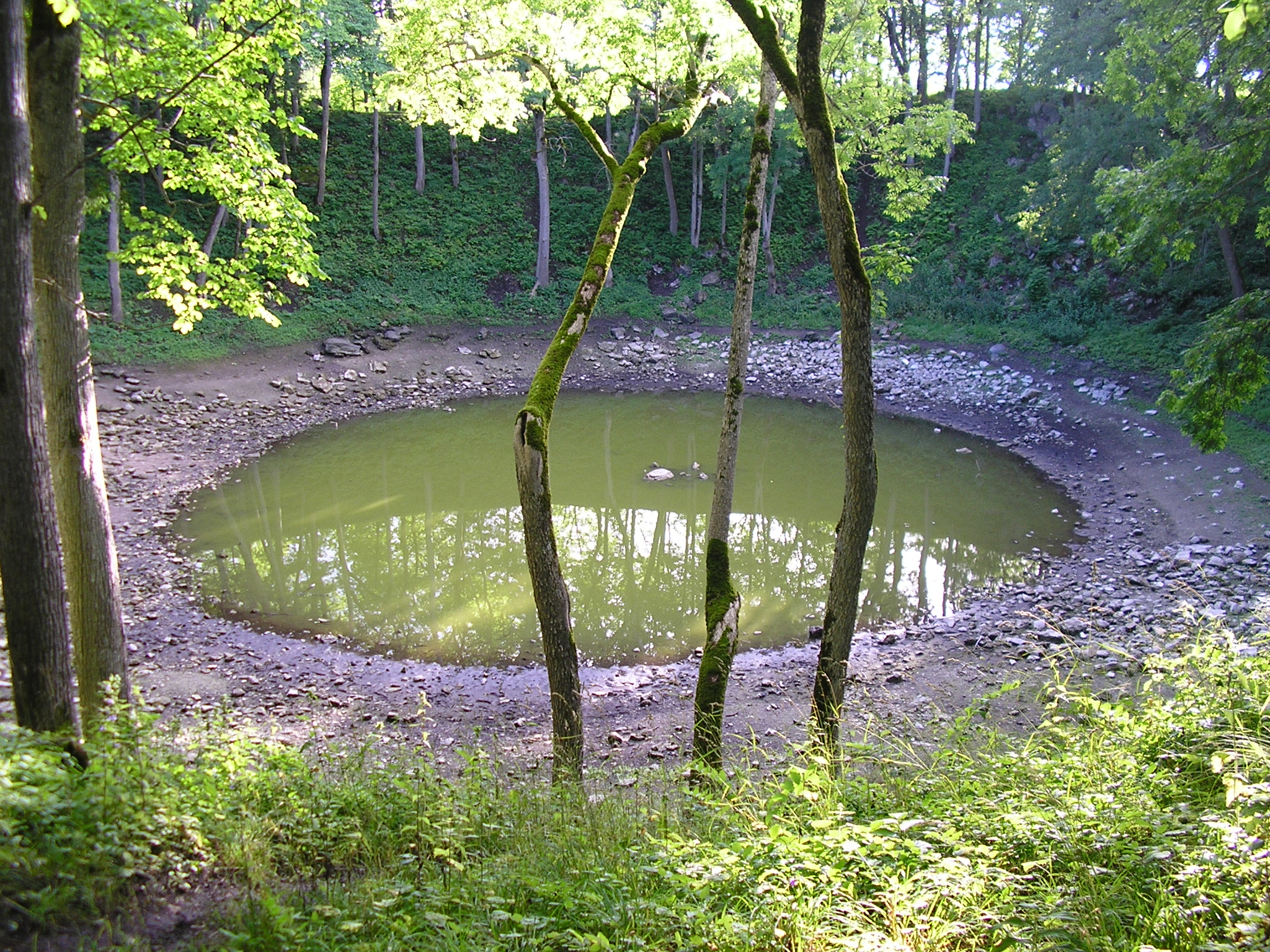
The nearly circular main Kaali meteorite crater

Kaali is a small group of nine unique meteorite craters on Saaremaa. The largest of the craters measures 110 m (360 ft) in diameter and contains a small lake, known as Lake Kaali (Estonian: Kaali järv). The meteor cluster had an impact velocity of 10–20 km/s (6–12 mi/s) and a mass of 20–80 metric tons (20–79 long tons; 22–88 short tons). At the altitude of 5–10 km (3–6 mi) the meteor broke into pieces. The largest fragment produced the main crater with a depth of 22 m (72 ft).

Eight smaller craters with diameters ranging from 12 to 40 m (39 to 131 ft) and depths varying from 1 to 4 m (3 to 13 ft) are all within 1 kilometer (0.62 mi) of the main crater. The age estimates of the crater vary, with 4000 ± 1000 BCE being a commonly accepted estimate, though other estimates suggest the explosion was as recent as 660 ± 85 BCE. The energy of the impact—about 80 TJ (20 kilotons of TNT), comparable with the Hiroshima bomb—burned forests within a radius of 6 km (3.7 mi) of the impact site. There are numerous legends related to the crater; these are summarized by former Estonian President Lennart Meri in his book Hõbevalge.

=== Resources ===
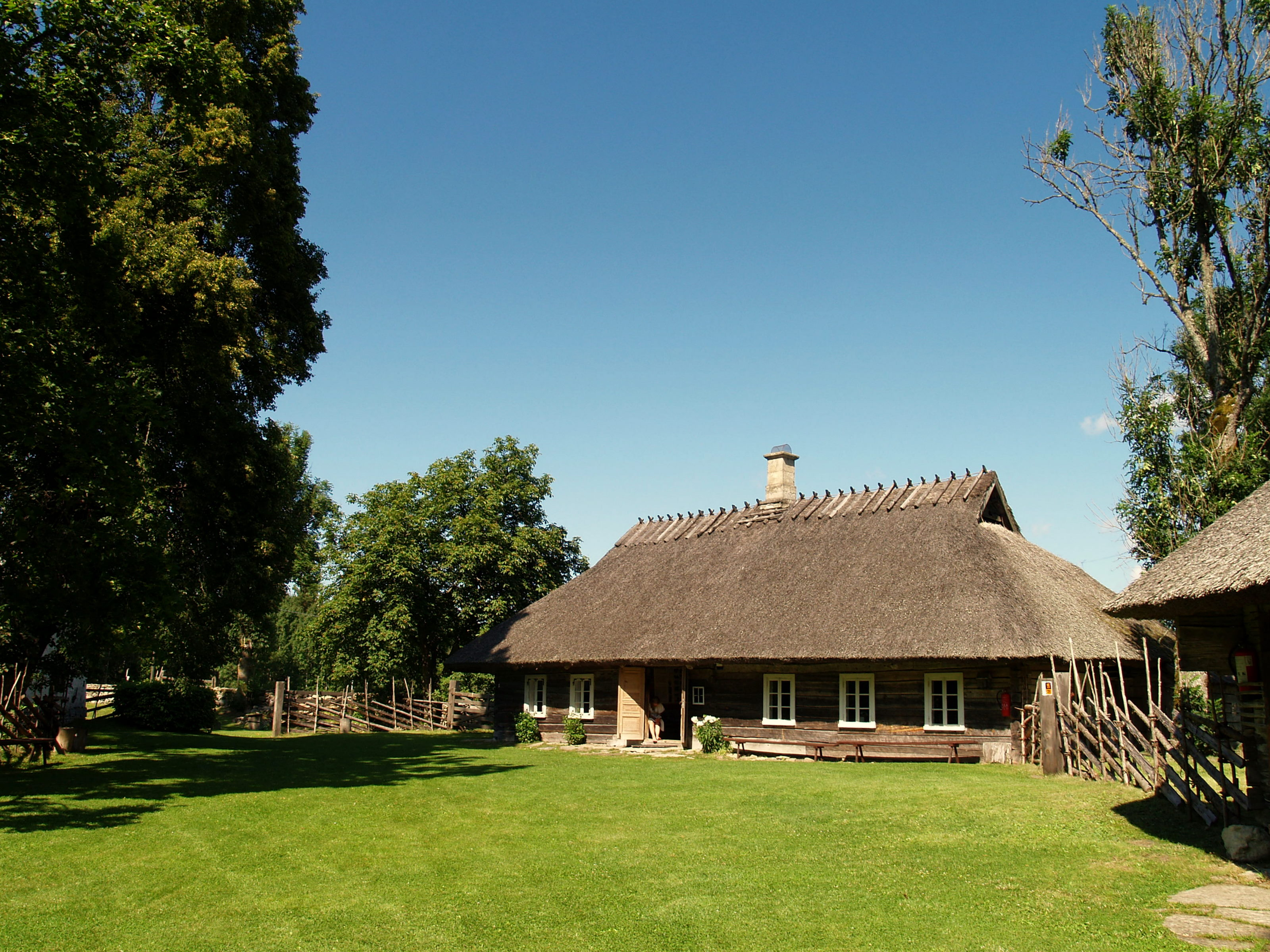
The Mihkli Farm Museum in Viki

Dolomite, limestone, curative mud, mineral water, ceramic clay, sand, and gravel are the major local resources. Of these local resources, dolomite is perhaps the most famous above all.

== Characteristics ==
The majority of the island's population is Estonian (97%). The two most numerous ethnic minorities, Russians and Finns, together comprise less than 3% of the inhabitants. Compared to the Republic of Estonia on the whole, the population of Saare County and particularly of Kuressaare town is younger, whereas the number of the retired people is considerably smaller. Saaremaa is located in the heart of the Baltic region, which is one of the most rapidly growing markets in Europe, with 70 million consumers. The island's "Gates to the West" include the reconstructed Kuressaare Airport and Roomassaare Harbour, the operation of modern ferries between Saaremaa and the Estonian mainland, and the rapid development of the telecommunications. Saaremaa is also a significant tourist destination, revisited by 35% of foreign and 95% of domestic tourists.

== Transportation ==
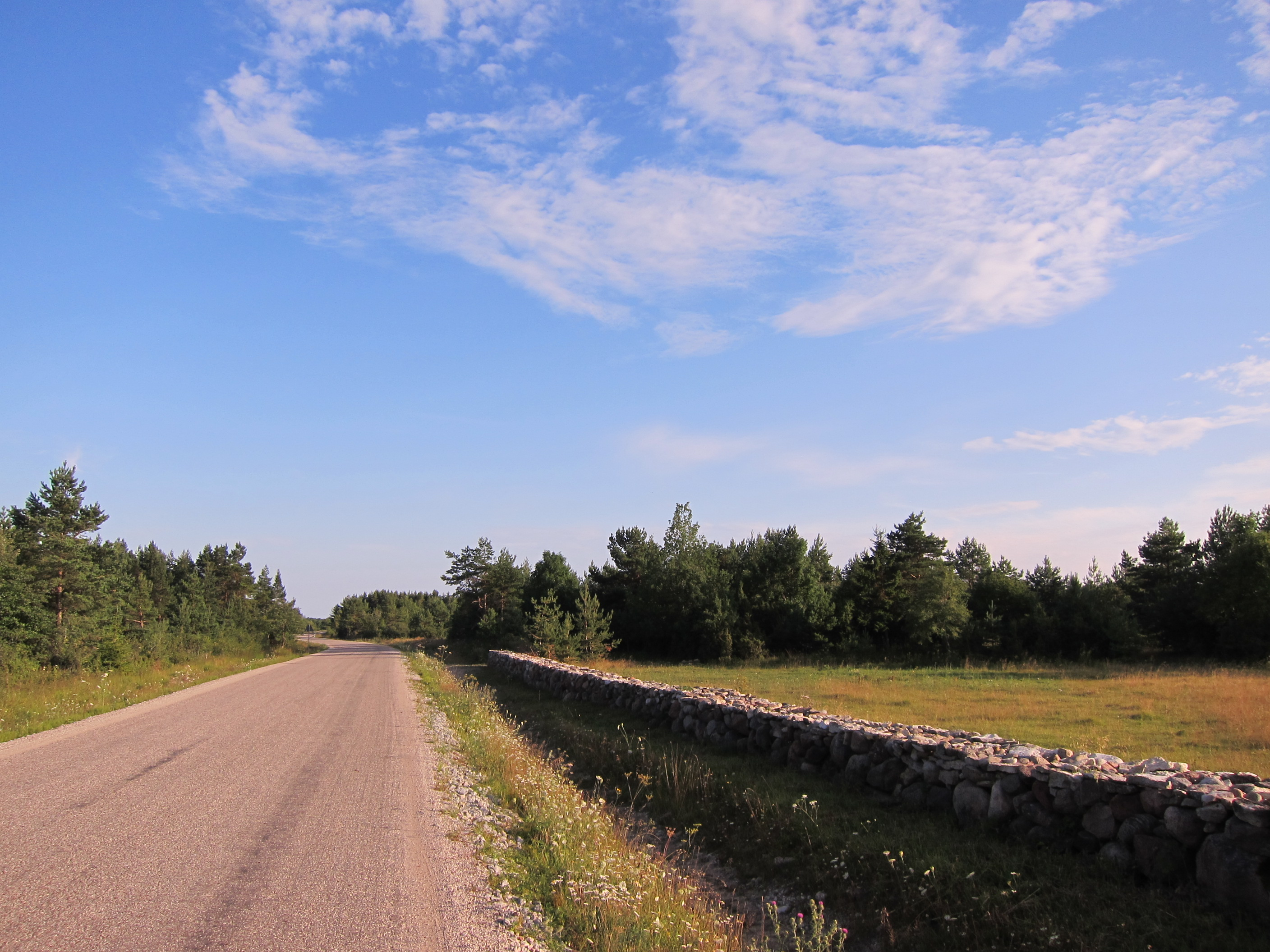
A typical road on Western Saaremaa

Saaremaa is reached by TS Laevad's ferries from Virtsu on the Estonian mainland to Kuivastu on Muhu island, which is itself connected to Saaremaa by a causeway, the Väinatamm. Saaremaa can also be reached by ferry from Sõru on the island of Hiiumaa to Triigi. There are also passenger services from Roomassaare to the smaller island of Abruka. During many winters it is possible to drive to Saaremaa by an ice road between the mainland and Muhu or between Saaremaa and the island of Hiiumaa.

There are regular bus services from Tallinn, Pärnu and Tartu on the mainland, which use the ferry from Virtsu to Muhu.

Kuressaare Airport offers regular flights to Tallinn operated by NyxAir. There are regular services to Ruhnu and Pärnu operated by Diamond Sky.

Historically there was a Soviet air base at Aste Airfield during the Cold War. Plans to connect Saaremaa to the mainland by either bridge or tunnel are being studied.

== Sport ==
FC Kuressaare competes in the first tier of Estonian football, the Meistriliiga. Saaremaa has been competing in the biannual Island Games since 1991. They have participated in the IIGA organised competition consistently since 1991, winning 126 gold medals, 129 silver medals and 101.5 bronze medals, as they shared a medal. In total they have won 356.5 medals during their time in the Games.

There are three main international traditional sport events in Saaremaa:

Saaremaa Rally takes place every year in October and attracts thousands of rally fans. The first rally was an amateur competition and it took place in 1974. The first professional competition took place in 1975 and from 1993 the rally has been international.

Saaremaa Velotuur is a group race of road cyclists that is oldest in the Nordic countries (held since 1957) and the only international one in the Baltic states.

Saaremaa three-day running marathon takes place on the roads around Kuressaare town and Sõrve peninsula. The main race consists of three different runs, which are held on three sequential days (10+16,195+16=42,195 km). The first marathon was held in 1974.

== Notable people ==
- Hannibal Sehested (1609–1666), Dano-Norwegian statesman and son-in-law of King Christian IV.
- Fabian Gottlieb von Bellingshausen (1778–1852), leader of the second expedition to successfully cross the Antarctic Circle.
- Louis Isadore Kahn (1901–1974), one of the most influential architects of mid-20th century.
- Paul F. Saagpakk (1910–1996), author of the largest Estonian-English dictionary (published in 1982).
- Arnold Rüütel (1928–2024), politician, President of Estonia 2001–2006
- Ott Tänak (born 1987), rally driver

== Images ==
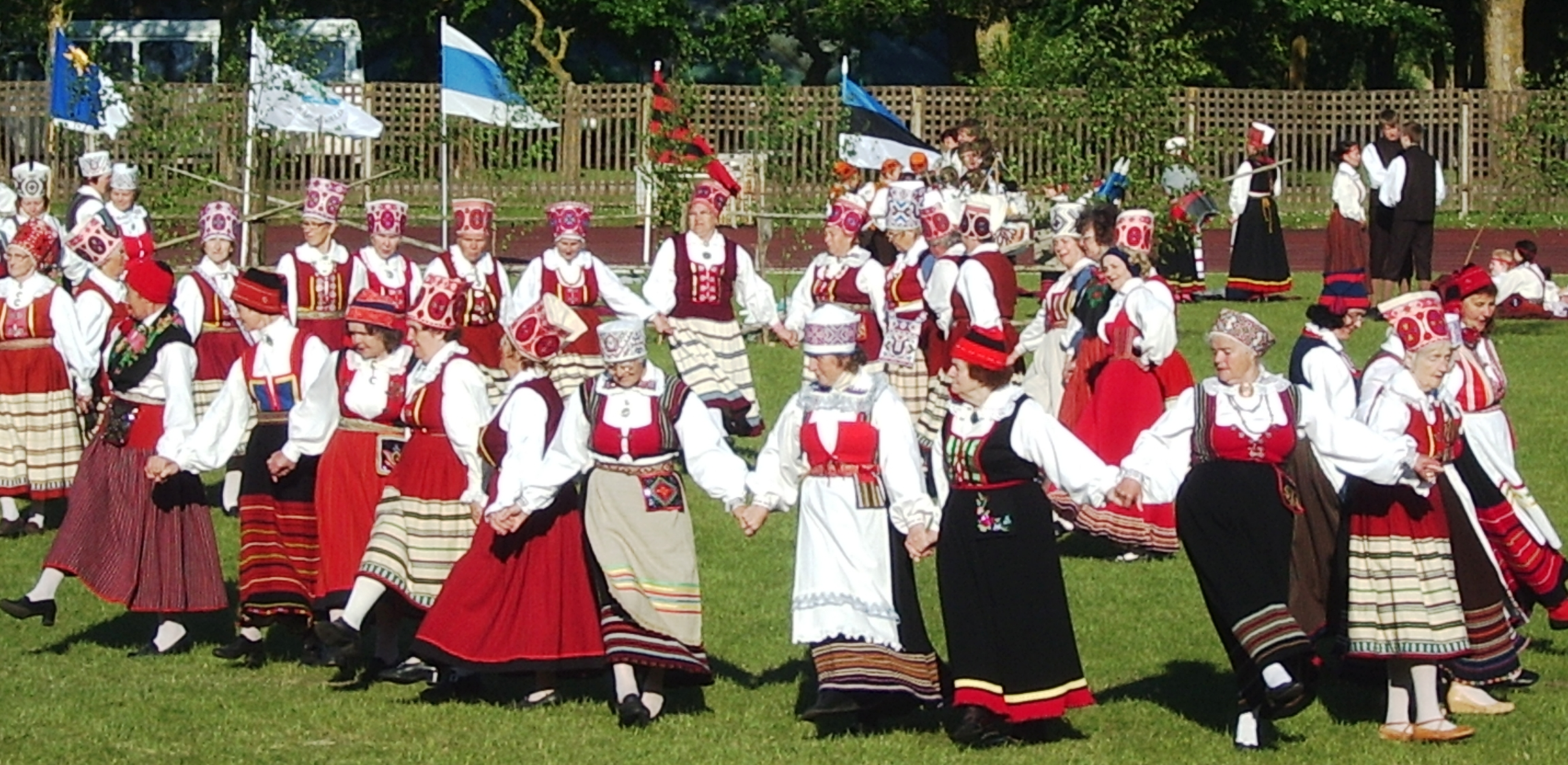
Women in traditional clothes folkdancing

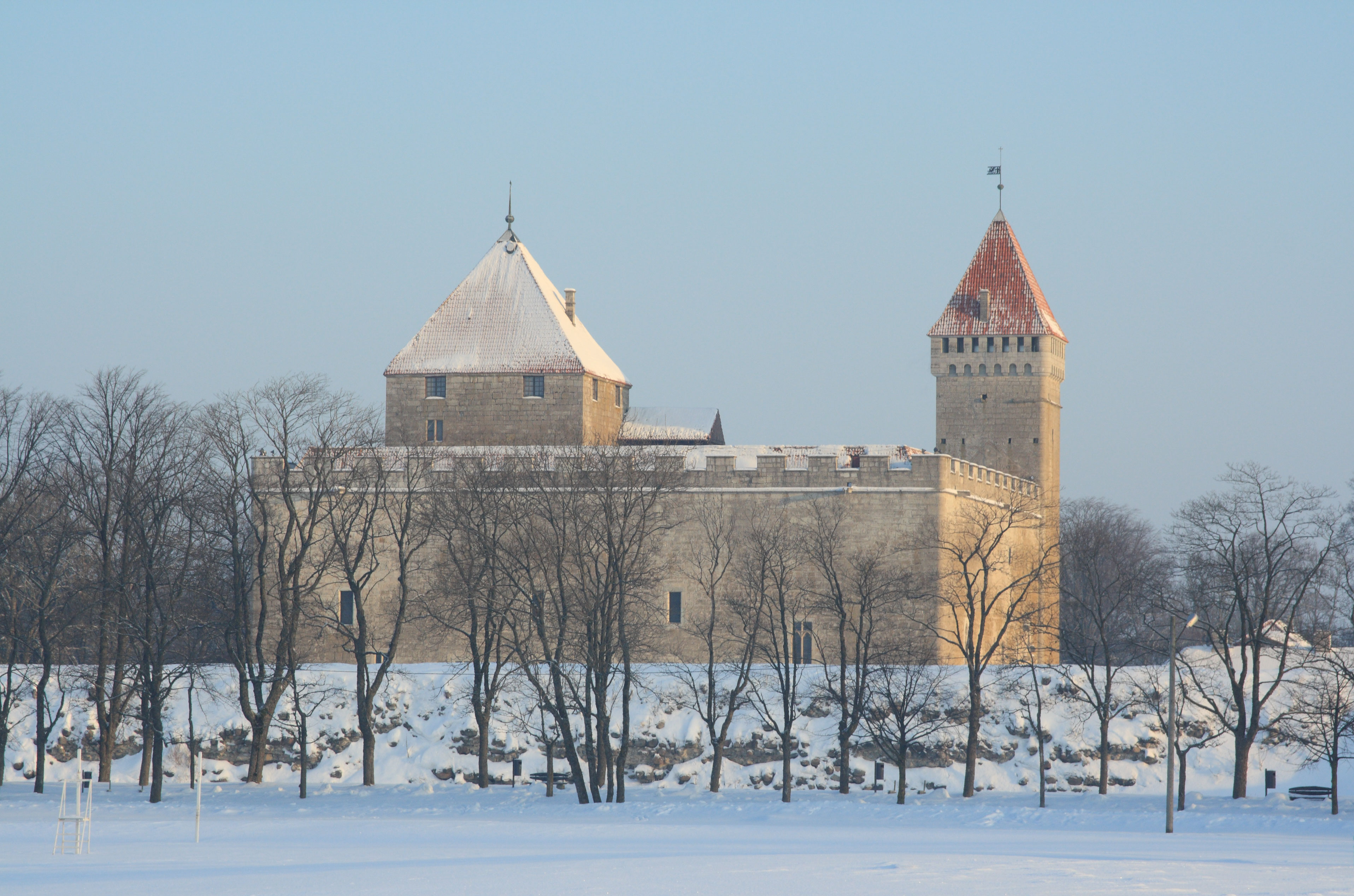
Kuressaare Castle in winter

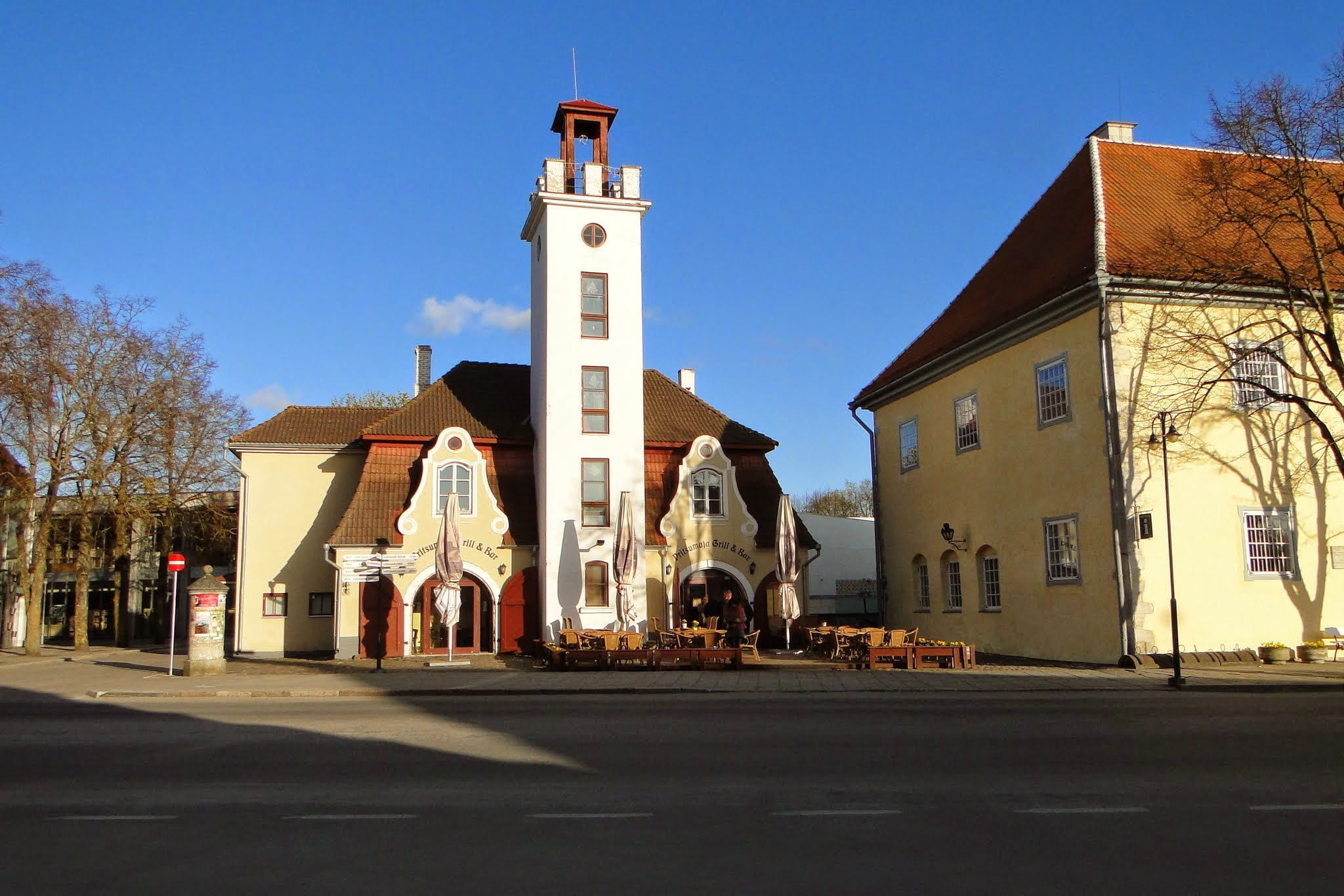
Historic buildings in Kuressaare

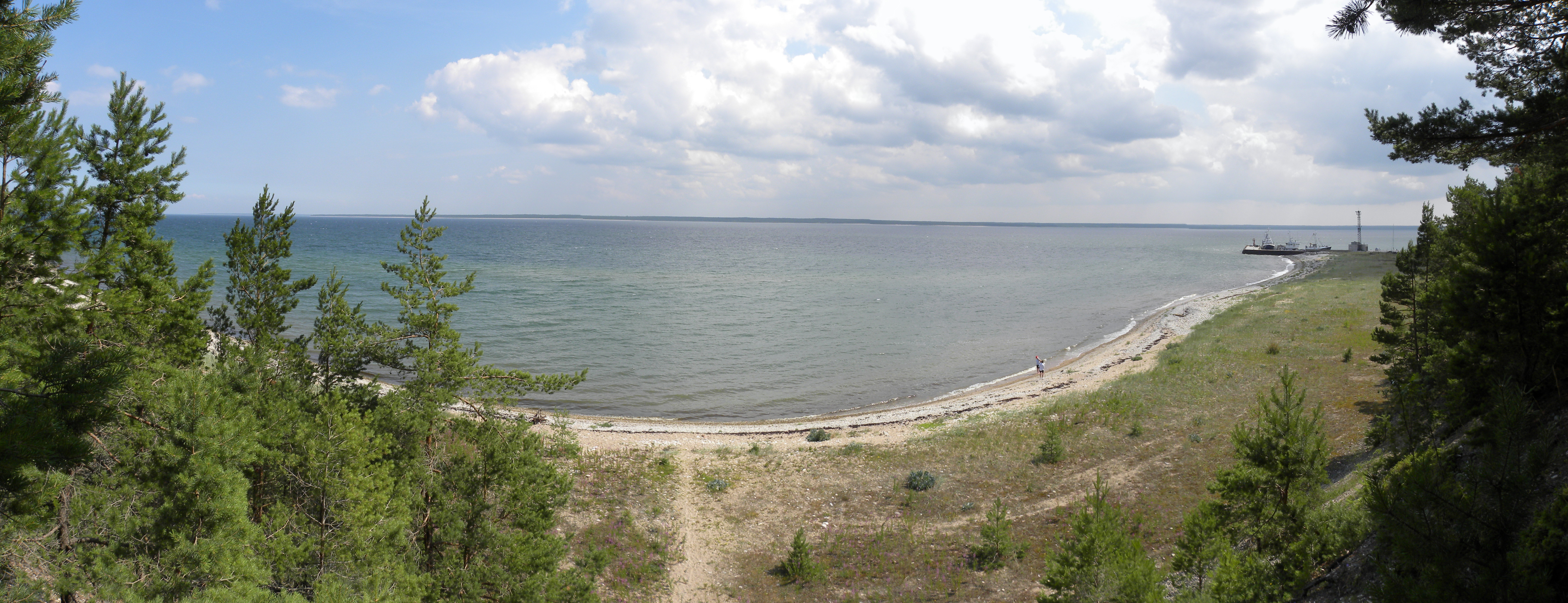
Tagalaht Bay panorama

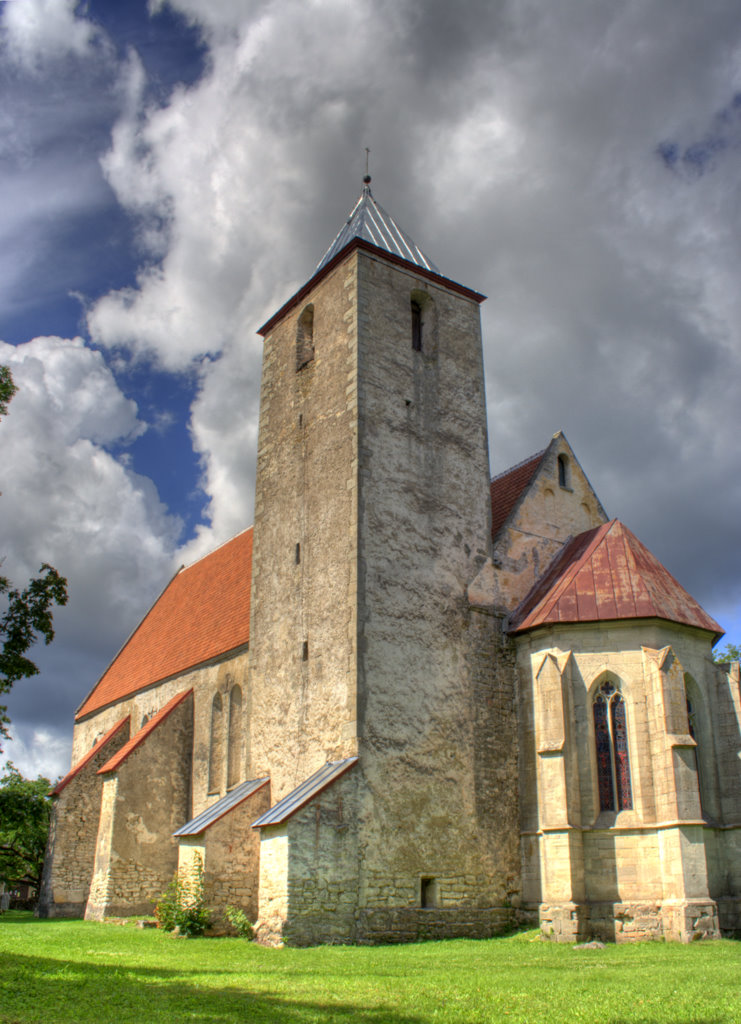
Valjala Church

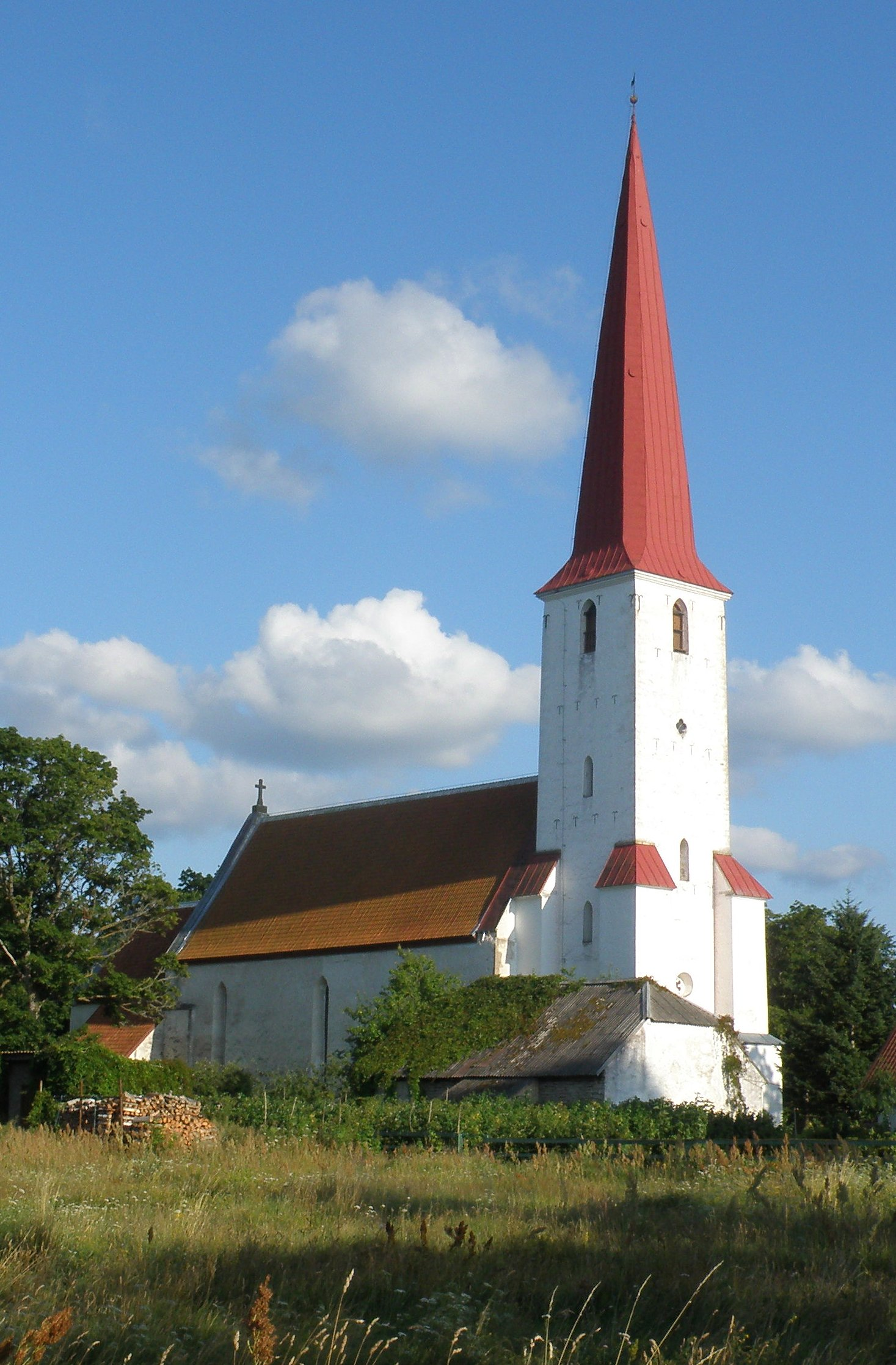
Kihelkonna Church

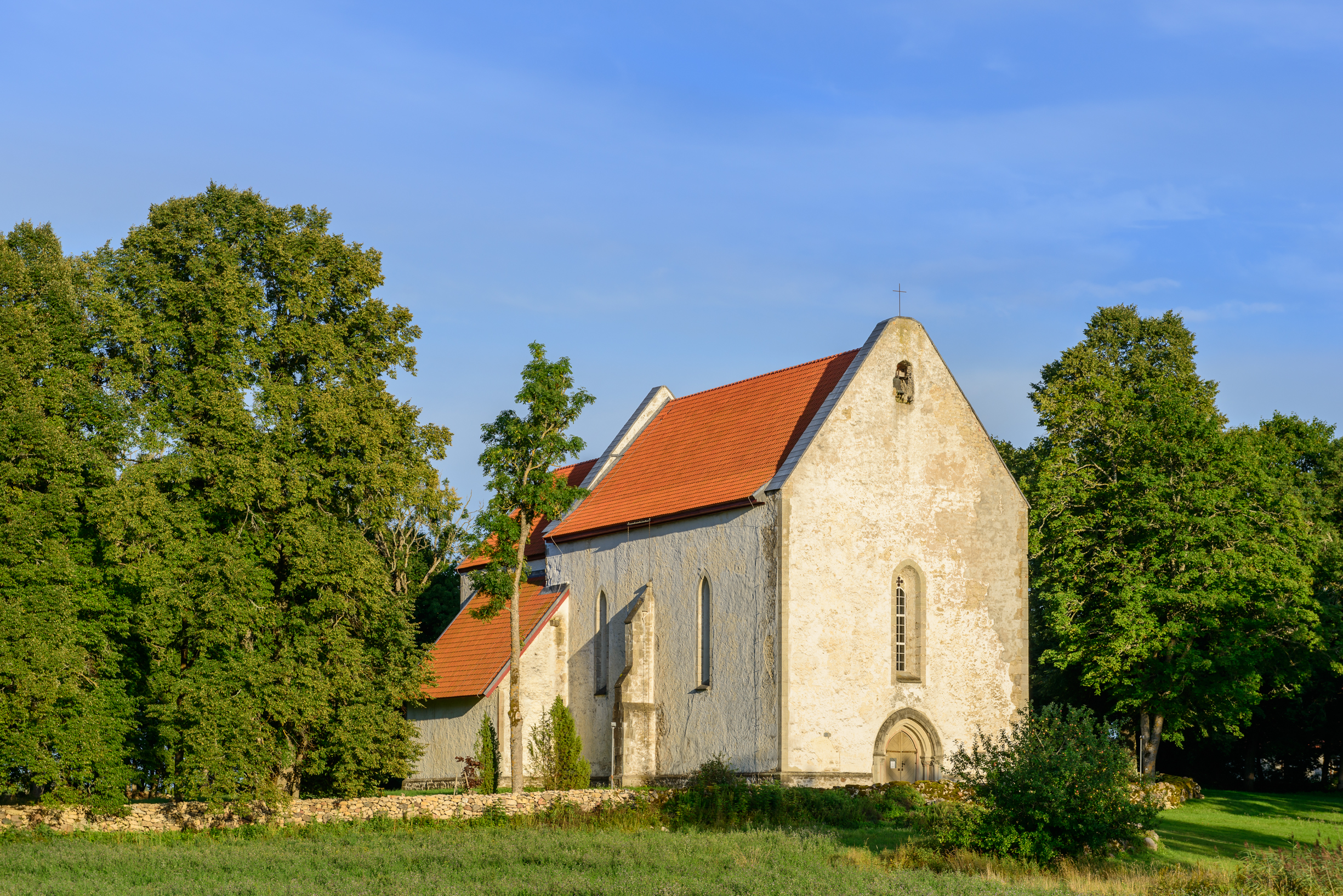
Karja Church in Linnaka

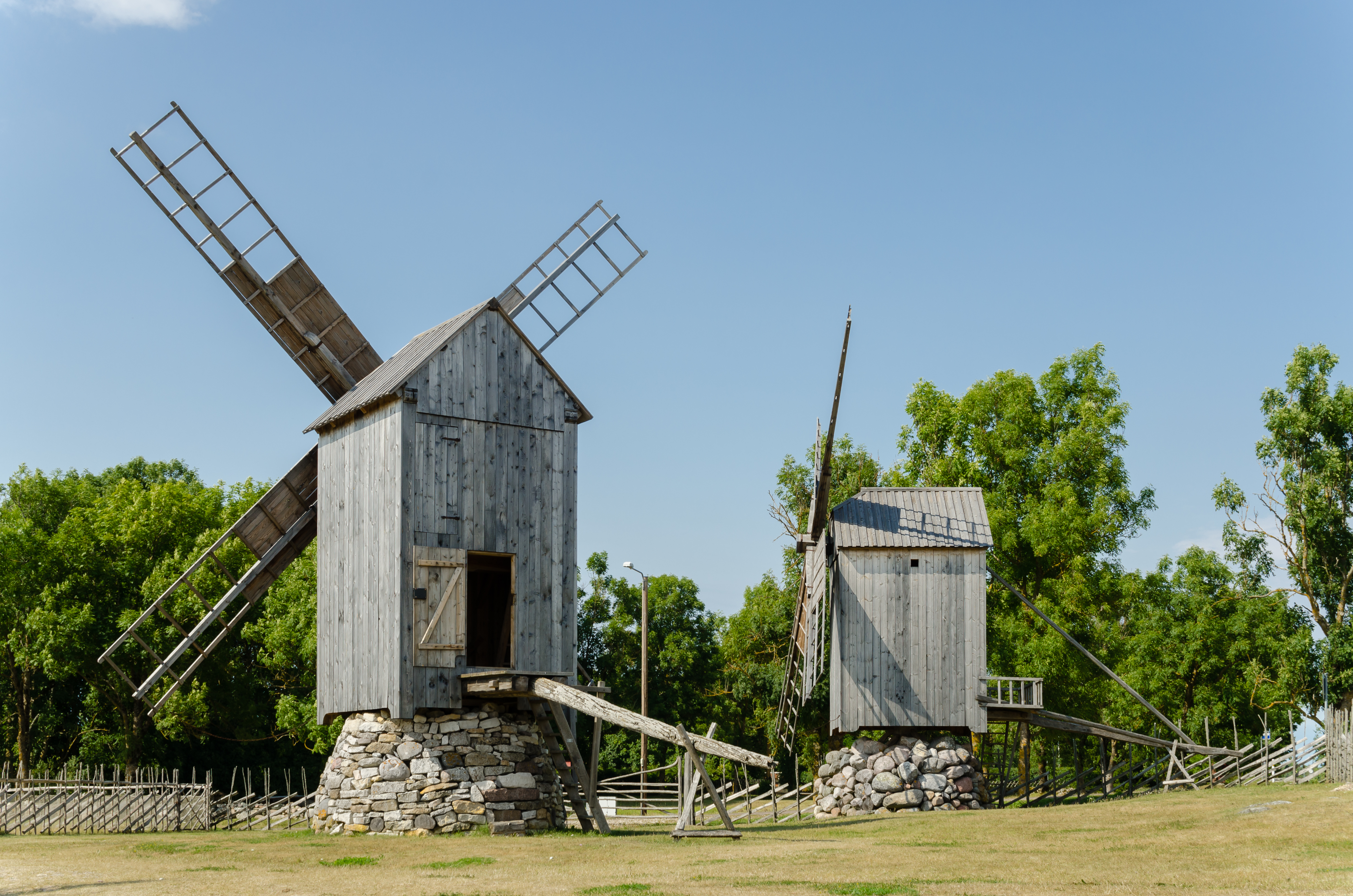
Angla windmills in Leisi Parish

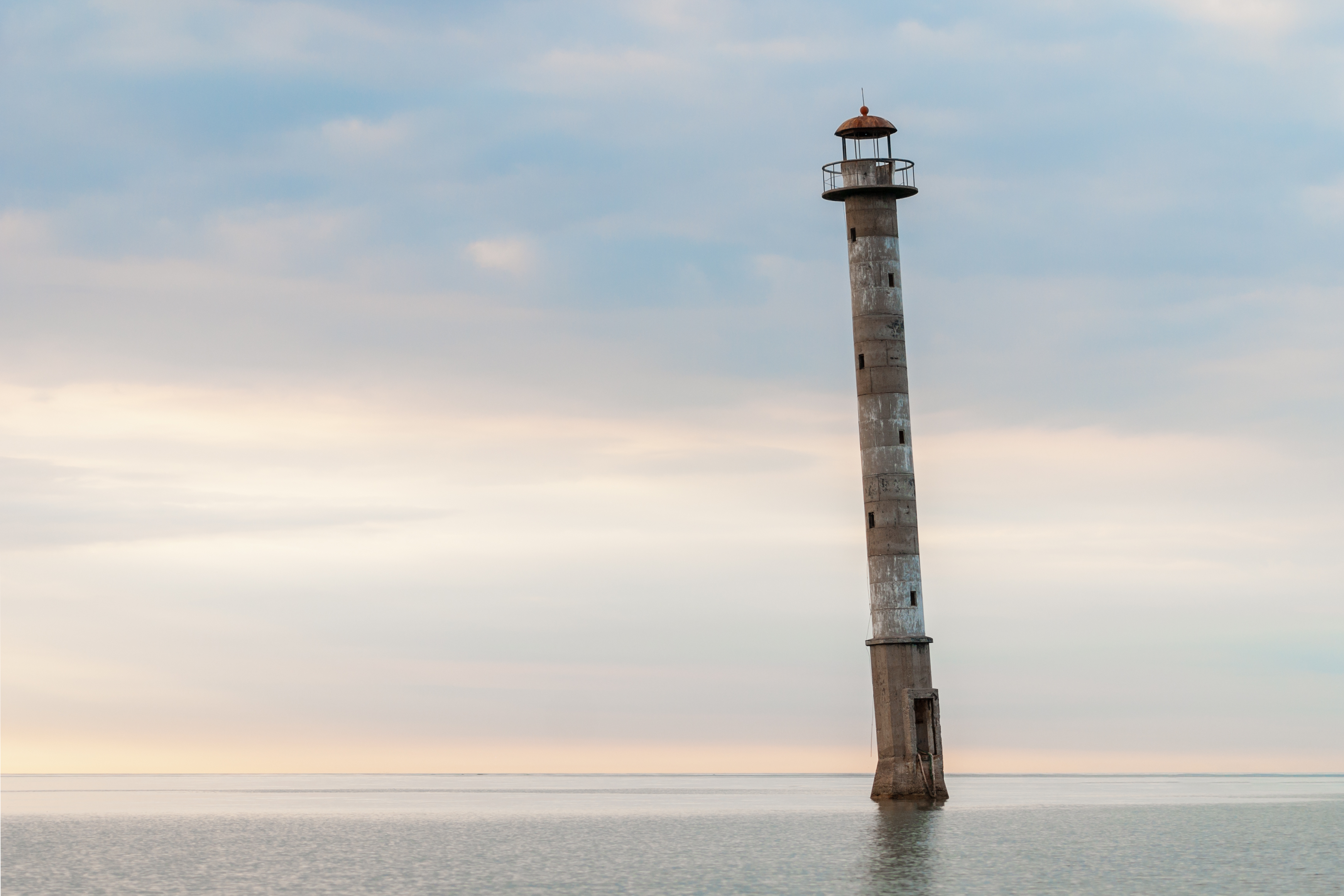
Kiipsaare leaning lighthouse

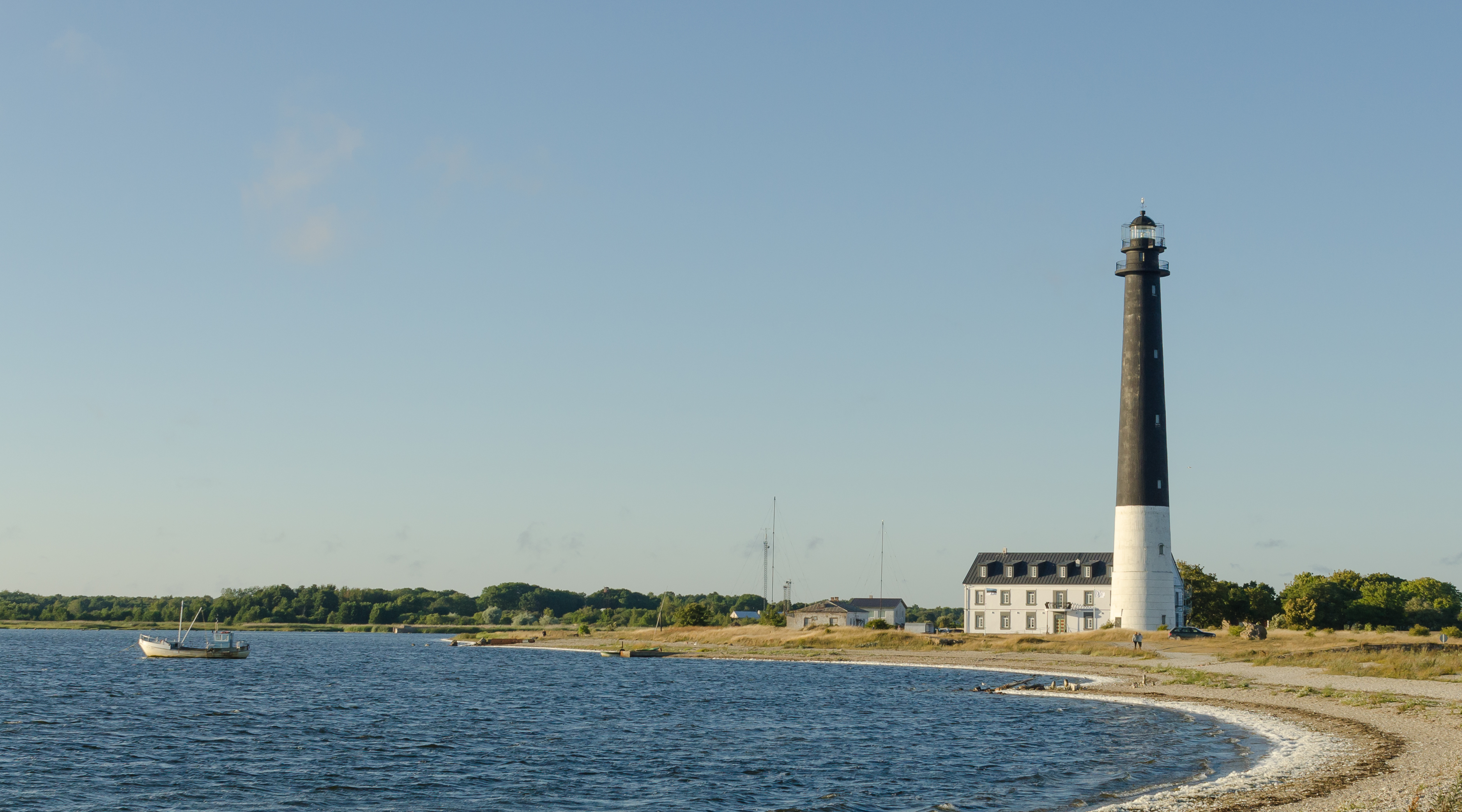
Lighthouse at Sõrve Peninsula

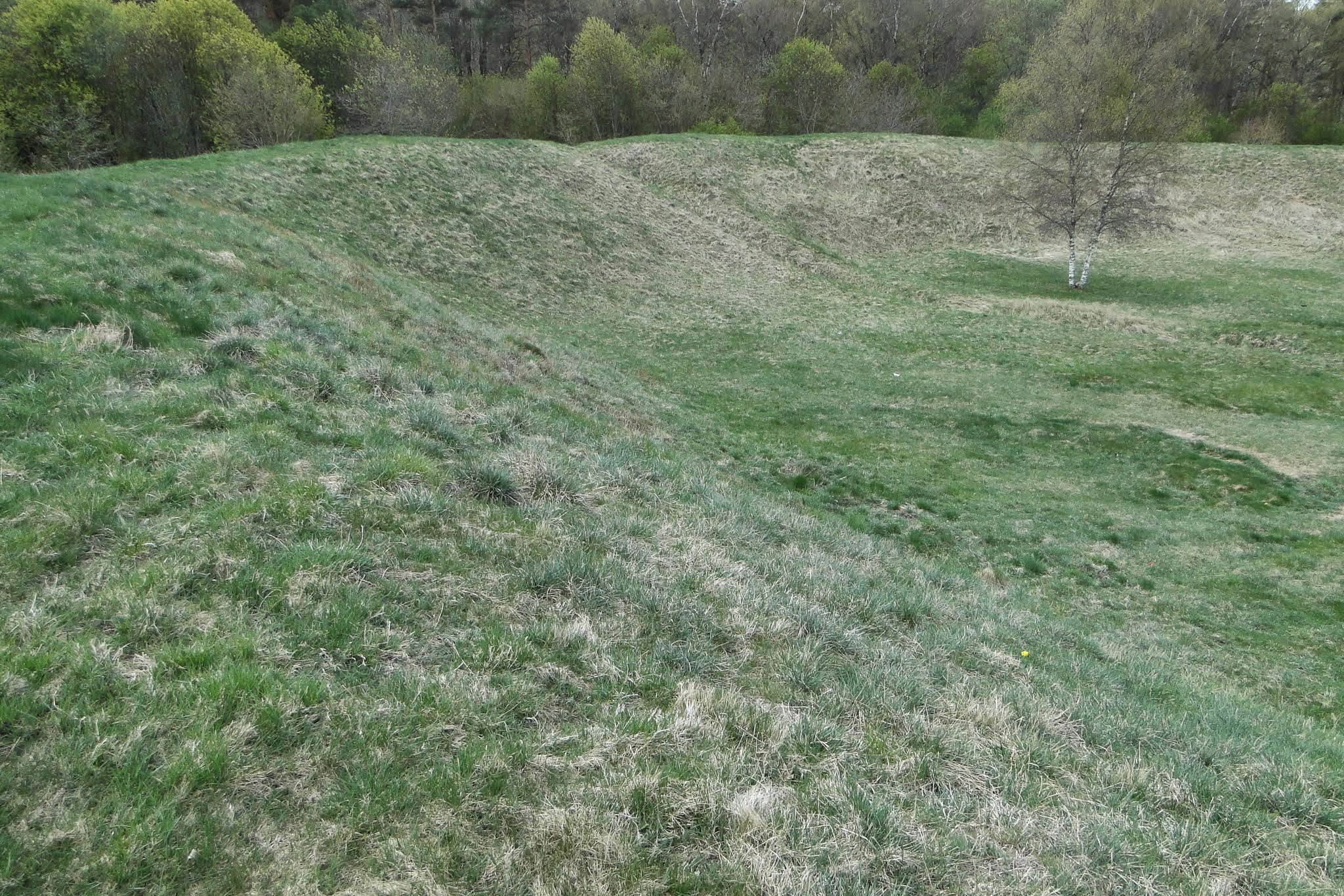
Kaarma ring fort

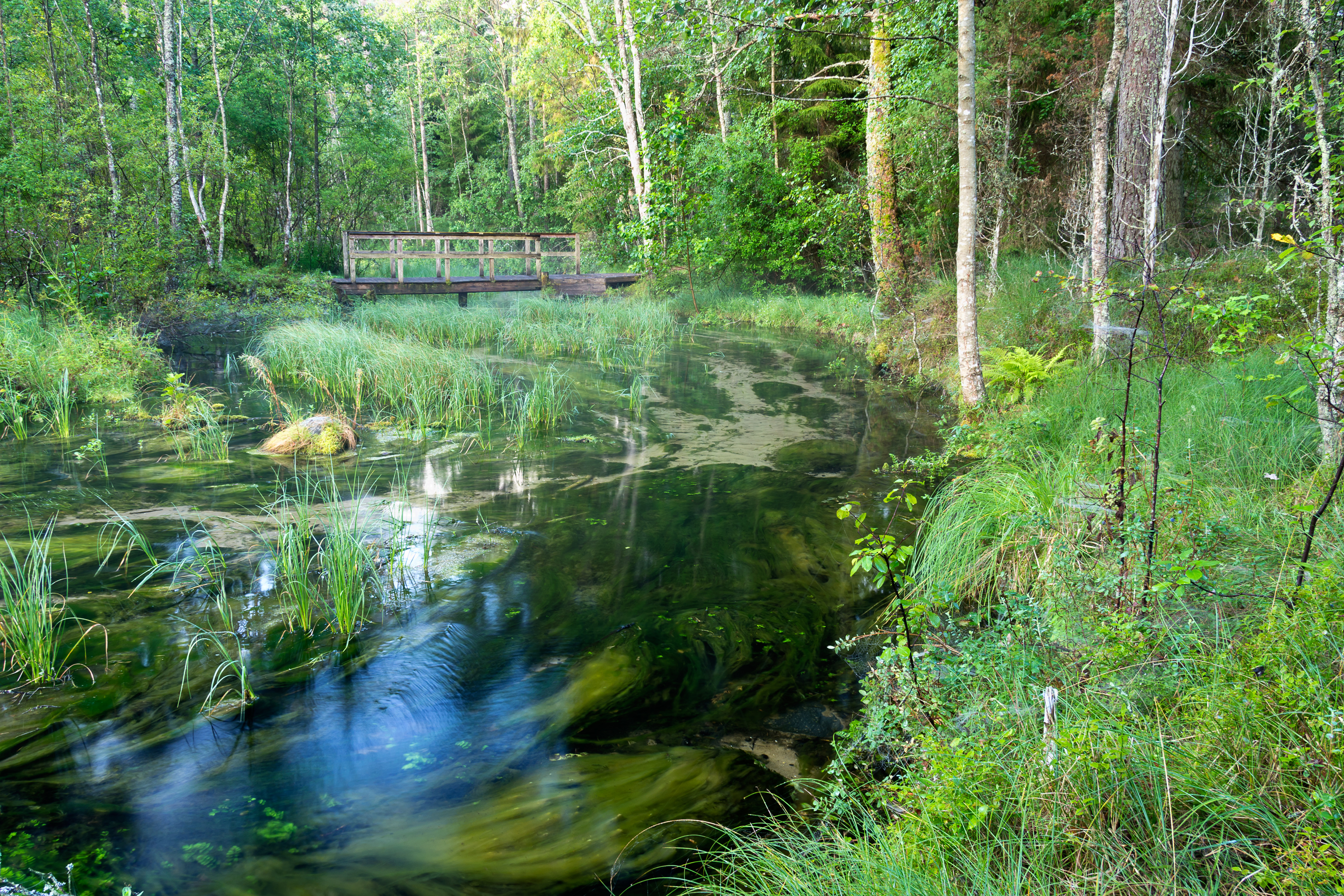
Odalätsi springs

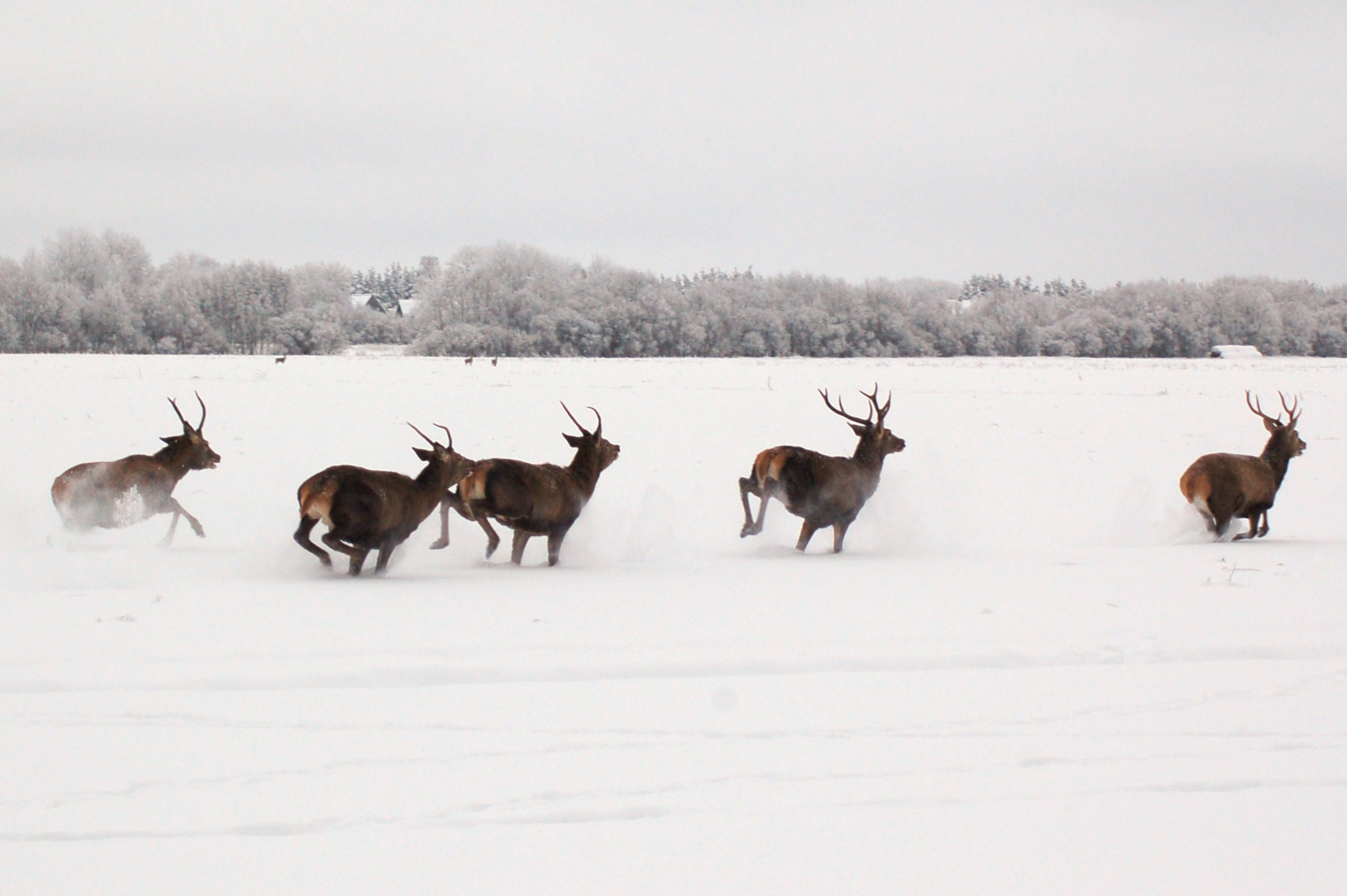
Deer near Leisi

Nasva Club

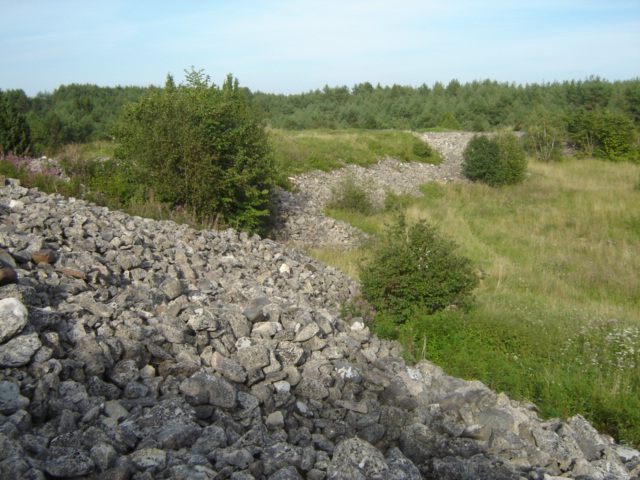
13th century fortress in Valjala

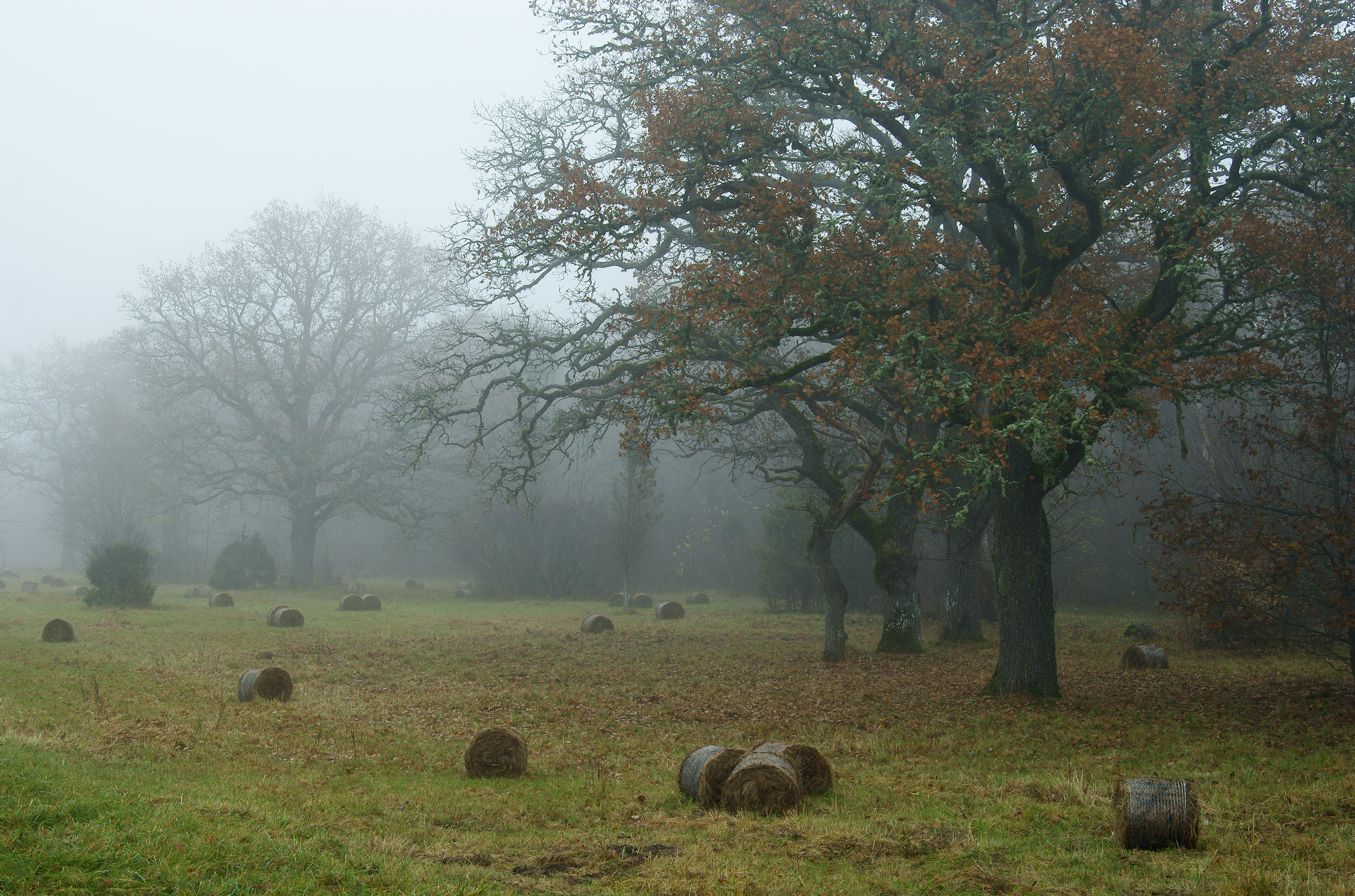
Saaremaa countryside

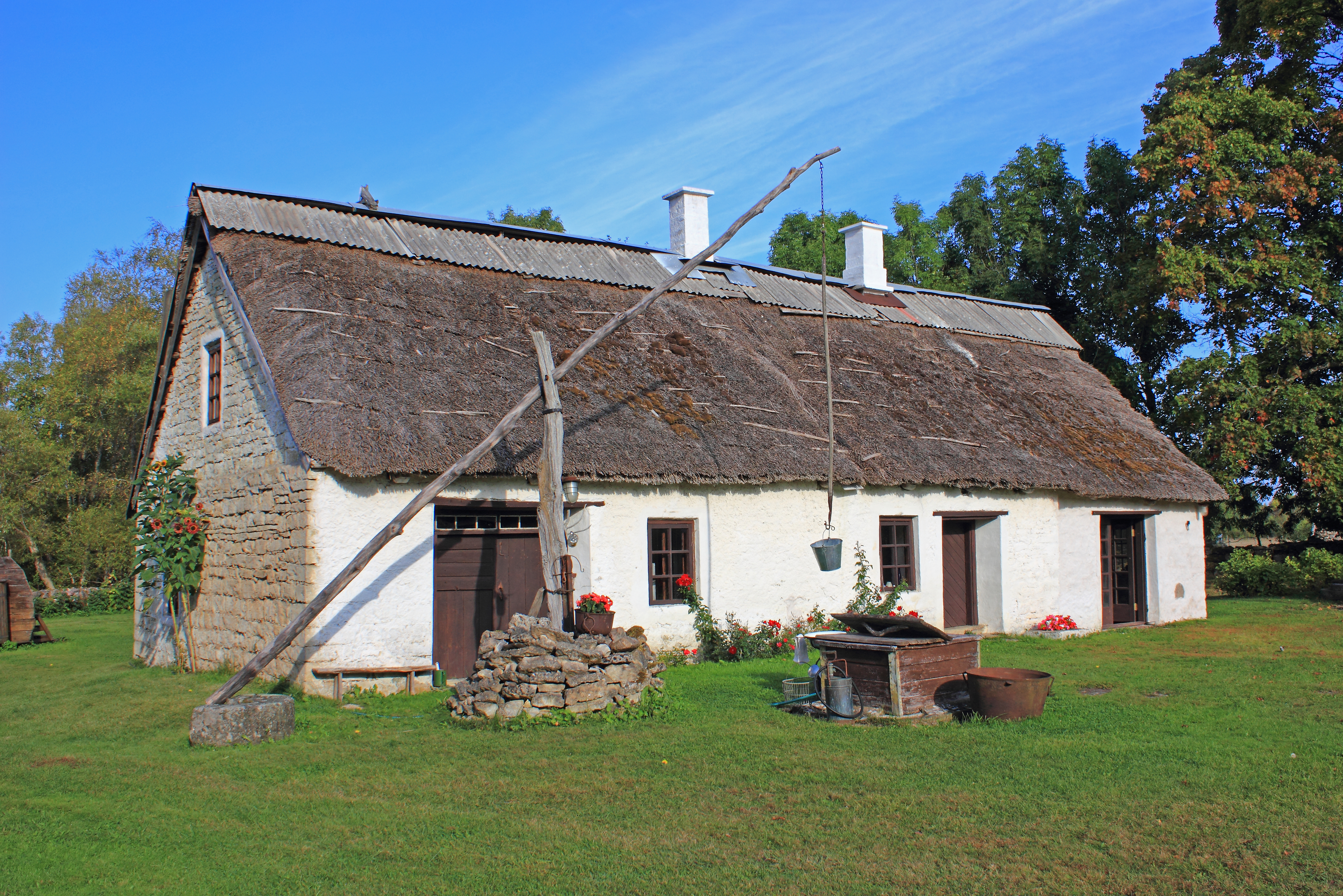
Farmhouse in Järveküla

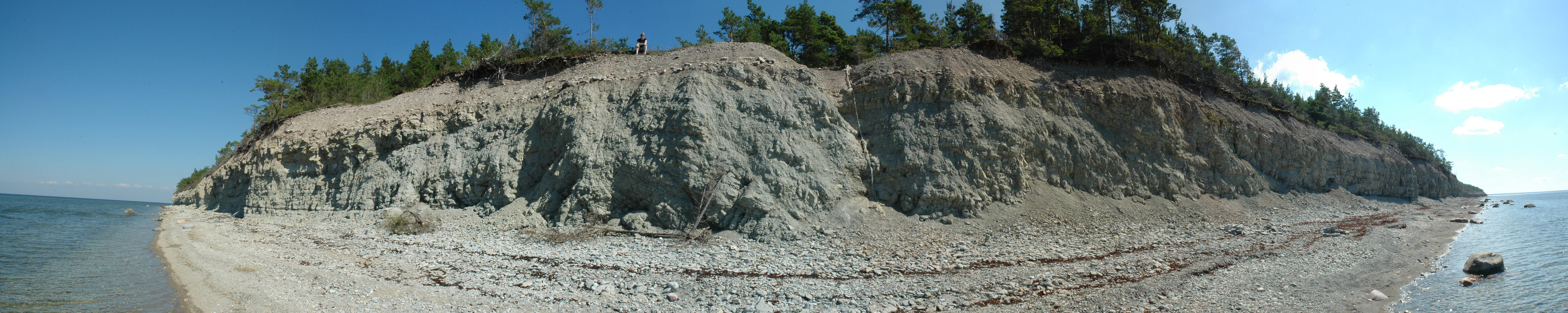
The cliffs near the village of Panga on the north coast of Saaremaa

== See also ==
- 4163 Saaremaa, asteroid
- List of islands in the Baltic Sea
- List of islands of Estonia
- Œsel – Œsel (Œselia), ancient Estonian independent eldership in the present territory of Saare County
- Saare County
