= Karja Church =

Church building in Estonia

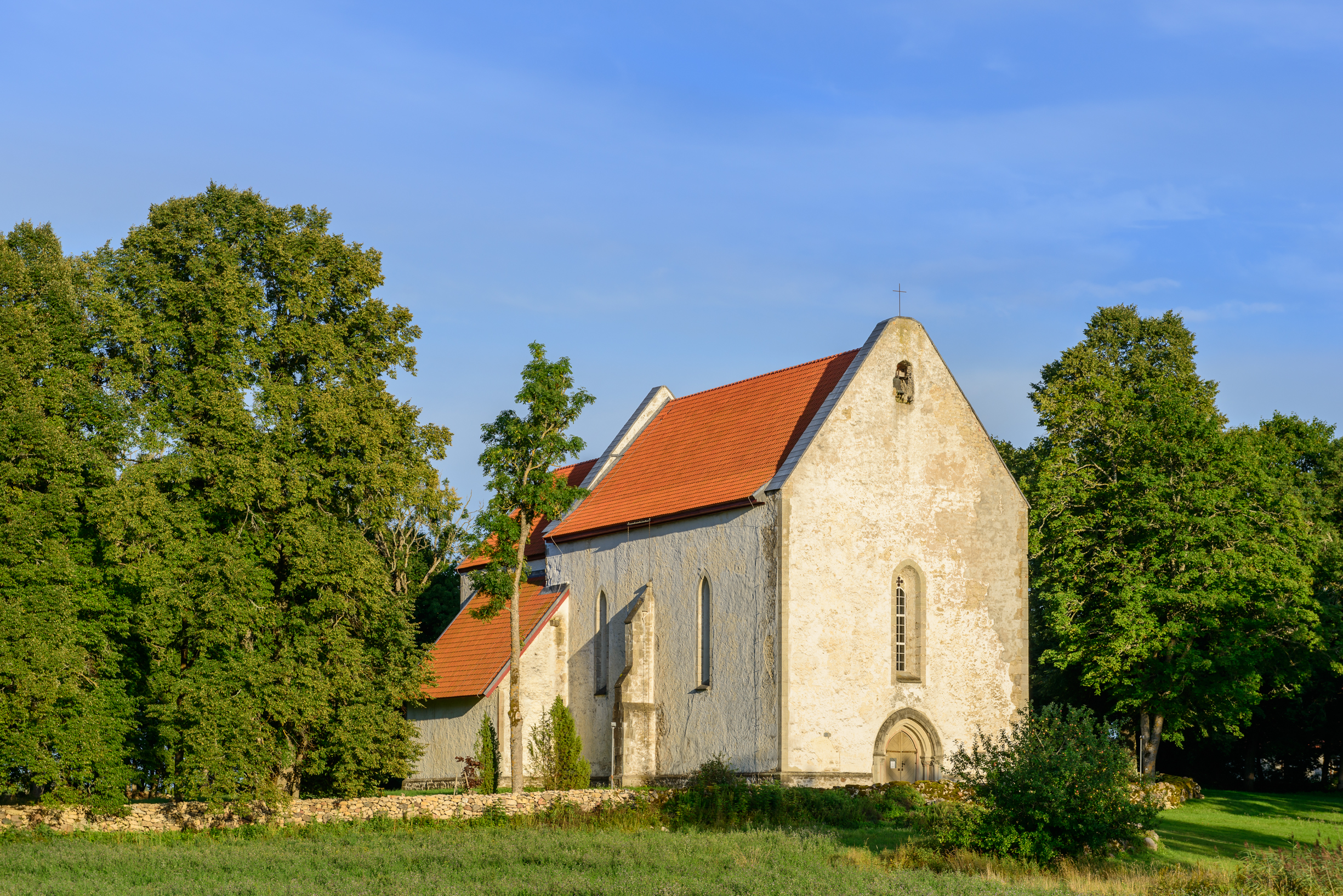
- Karja church, façade

- Location within Estonia
- 58°31′24″N 22°43′57″E
- Country: Estonia
- Denomination: Lutheran

History
- Founded: probably late 13th century to early 14th century

Architecture
- Style: Romanesque; Gothic

Karja Church (Estonian: Karja kirik) is a medieval Lutheran church located in the Linnaka village on Saaremaa island, Estonia. It is the rural church with the richest medieval stone sculpture decoration in all the Baltic states.

The church and the rectory are located on a higher plateau, at the foot of which there is a small body of water, which is also visible on 18th-century maps. To the north of the church is the Kalmu field, where there were probably stone graves. It has also been assumed that before the church the place had already been considered sacred.

== History ==
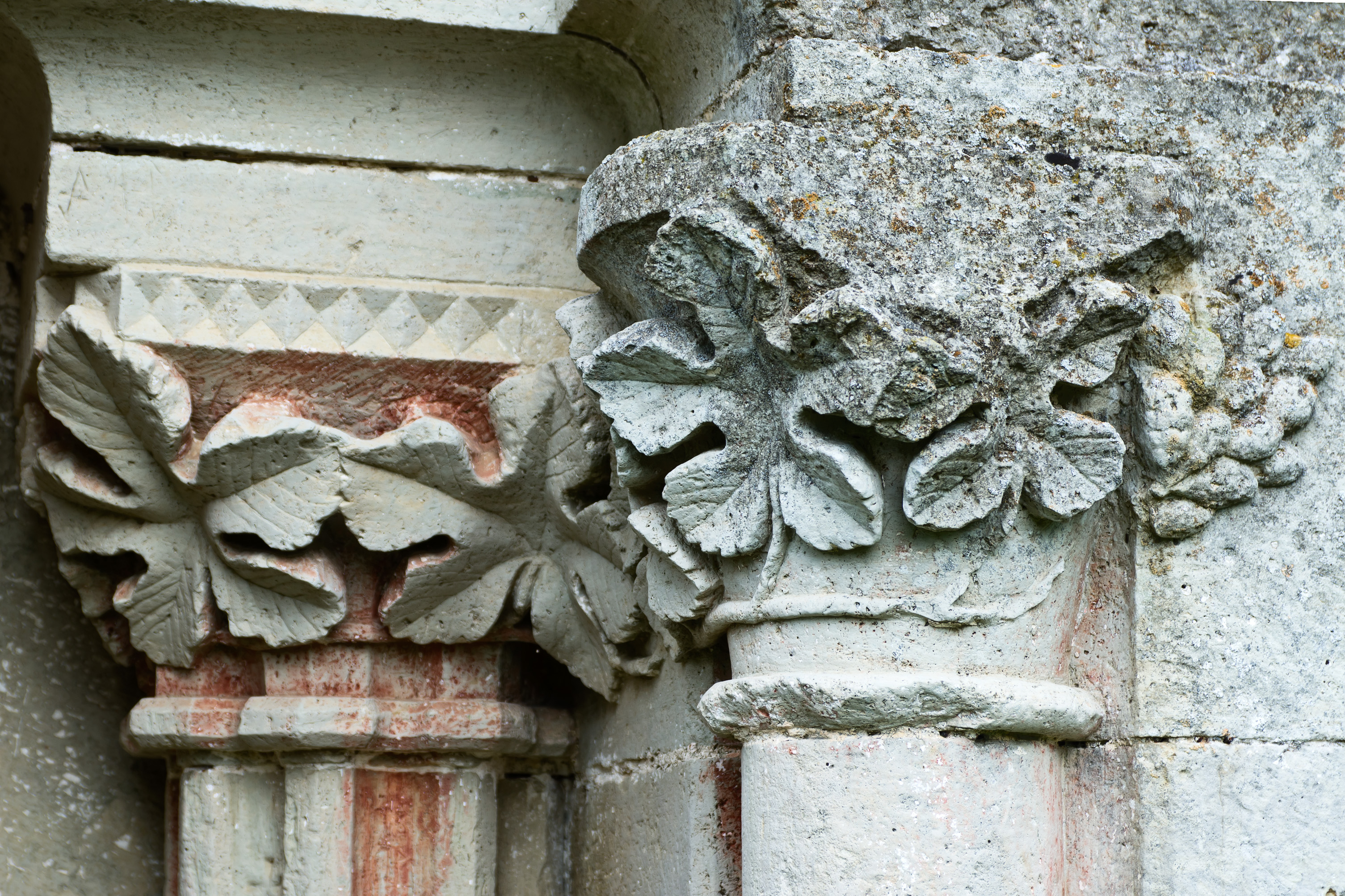
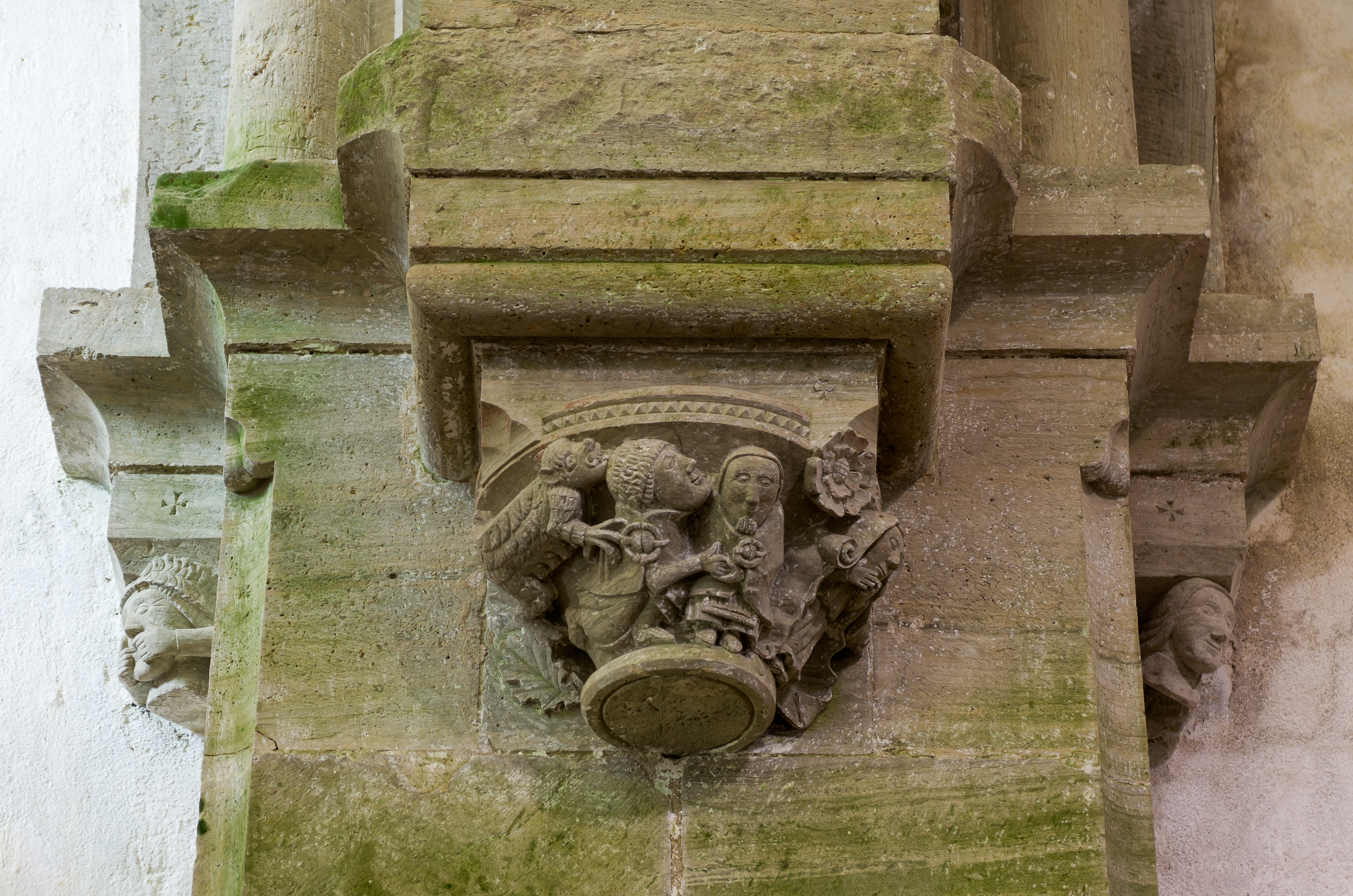
Carved stone decoration in Karja church

The origins of the church are not well known, but it was most probably constructed sometime during the late 13th or early 14th century. Originally it was dedicated to St. Catherine and St. Nicholas. There is evidence that the church was from the beginning designed not only as a place of worship, but also to be able to function as a refuge in times of danger or war; there are rooms above the vestry and the vaulted ceiling, equipped with fireplaces and not readily accessible, which may have been designed to be able to house the congregation safely. In later times, these areas were probably used by pilgrims from Scandinavia travelling to Livonia. The fact that the church served as a stopover for pilgrims may also serve to explain how it got its rich decoration.

== Architecture ==
The church is rather small, compared with other medieval churches on Saaremaa, and elsewhere nearby, and of simple form. It has a single nave, spanned by high, whitewashed vaults forming two bays, a simple choir and a vestry. Interior details worth mentioning are on the baptismal font from the 14th century, a crucifix from the 15th century and the pulpit, dating from 1638 and made by local artisan Balthasar Raschky. What makes the church unique, however, is its rich interior decoration.

=== Murals ===
The interior of the church displays several relatively well-preserved medieval mural paintings. These depict symbols, probability of pagan origin, such as a triskelion, pentagram, grotesque devils and other symbols of unclear significance. In addition, there are also more purely decorative murals.

=== Stone sculpture ===
The church is profusely rich in carved stone sculpture, present on portals, brackets and bosses throughout the church. The stone carvings have probably been executed by successive generations of master carvers, including, very probably, artisans from Germany, Sweden and France. The style of the decorations range from Romanesque to Gothic and high Gothic. The motives ranges from purely decorative foliage, to a Calvary group adjacent to the south portal, a notable sculpture group depicting St. Catherine, patron saint of scholars, holding a book and an equally prominent carved sculpture of St. Nicholas, patron saint of fishermen, accompanied by a monk holding a ship. The Calvary shows Mary and John mourning and the two crucified robbers: one of them listened to Jesus and repented of his sins, the other only laughed at Christ's words. The relief depicts the moment when the souls, in the form of little children, depart from the robber's bodies. An angel takes care of one of the souls, while the other has makes a journey with the Devil.

=== Gallery ===
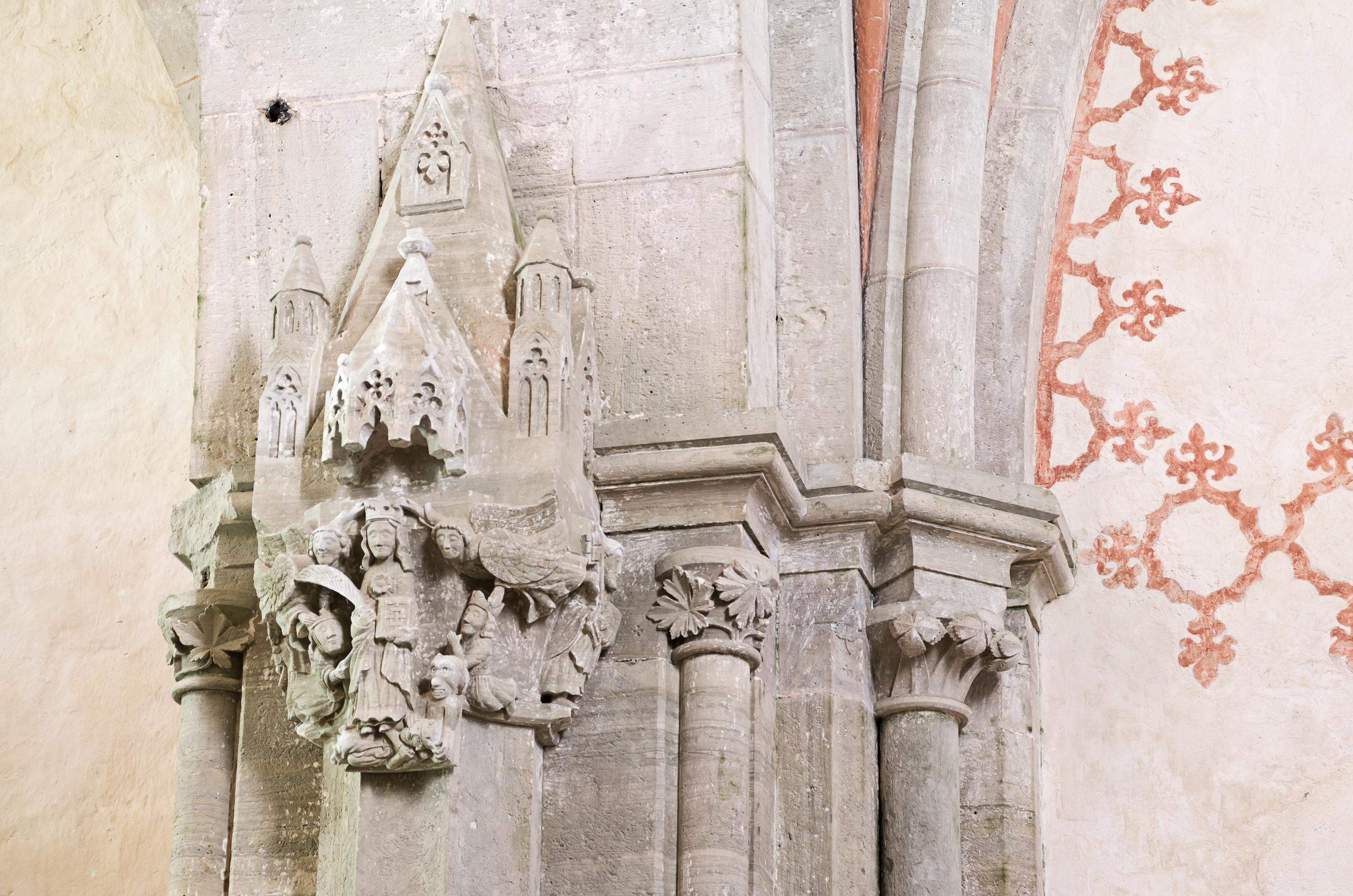
St. Catherine group

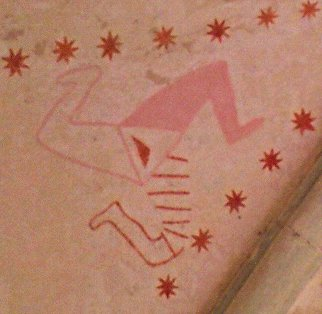
Mural with triskelion

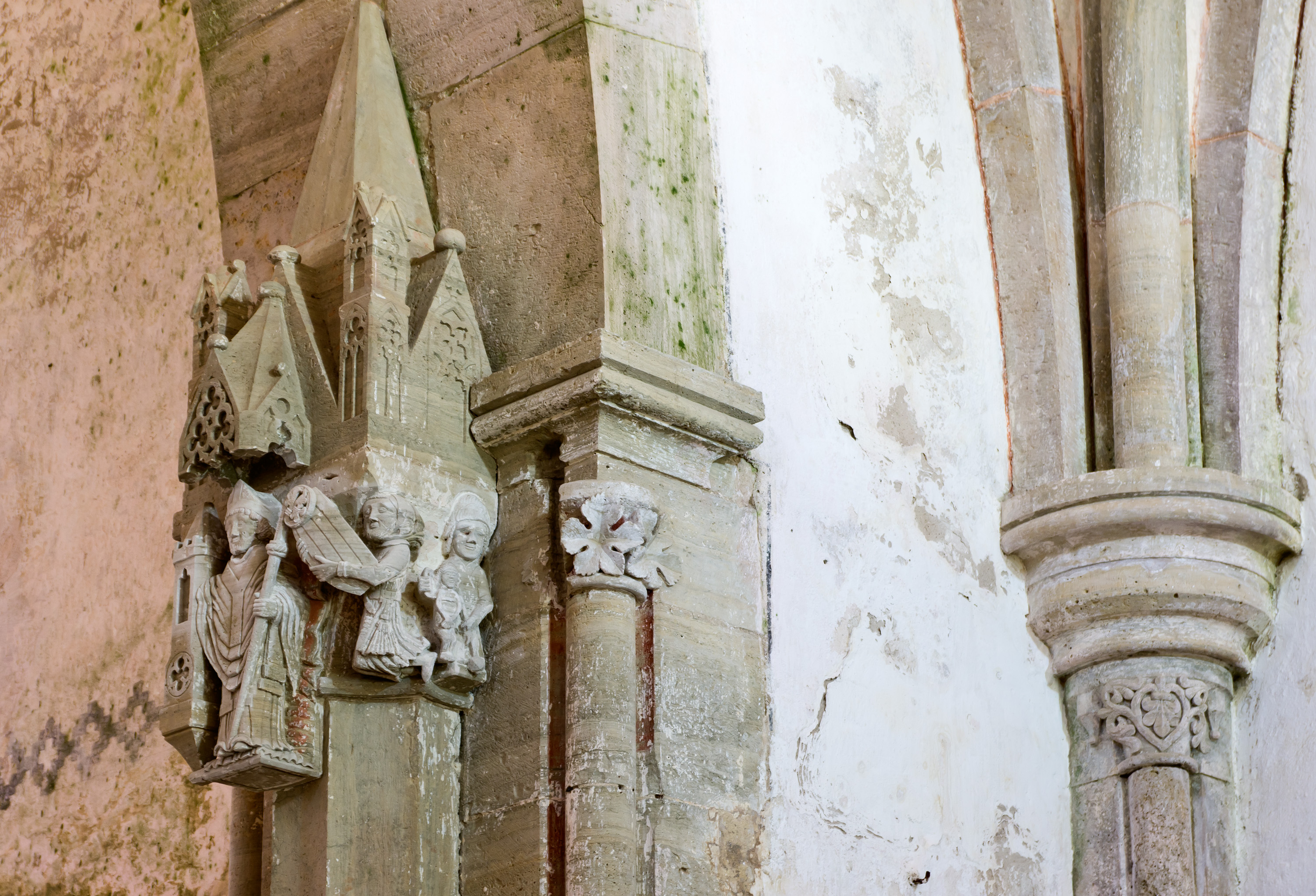
St. Nicholas group

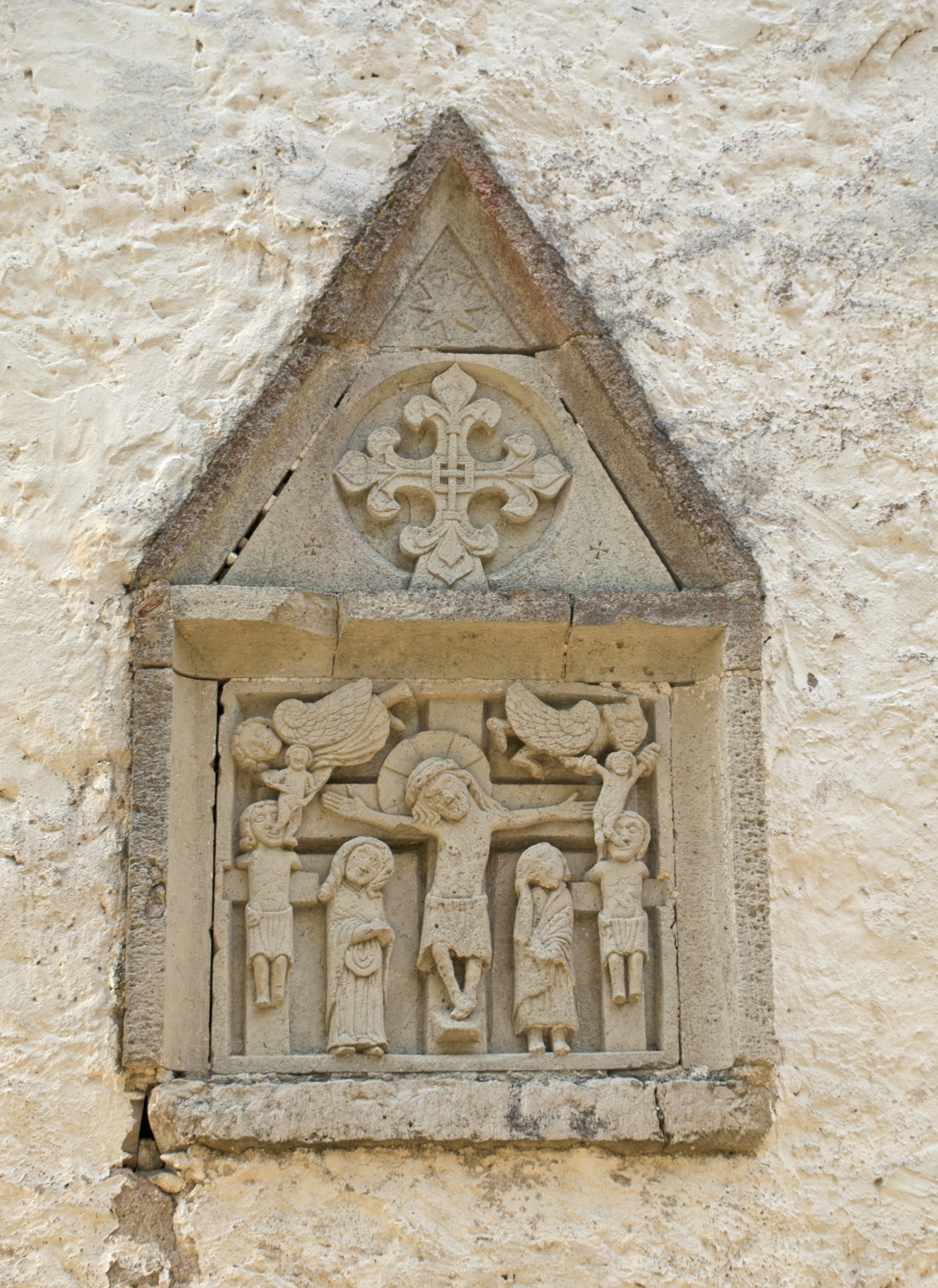
Crucifixion relief

== See also ==
- Architecture of Estonia
