= Kihelkonna St. Michael's Church =

Church building in Estonia

- Location within Estonia
- 58°21′36″N 22°02′08″E
- Country: Estonia
- Denomination: Lutheran

History
- Founded: c. 1250
- Founder(s): Livonian Order; Bishopric of Ösel-Wiek

Architecture
- Style: Gothic

Kihelkonna St. Michael's Church, (Estonian: Kihelkonna Mihkli kirik) sometimes simply Kihelkonna Church, is a medieval Lutheran church on Saaremaa island in western Estonia.

== History ==
=== Construction ===
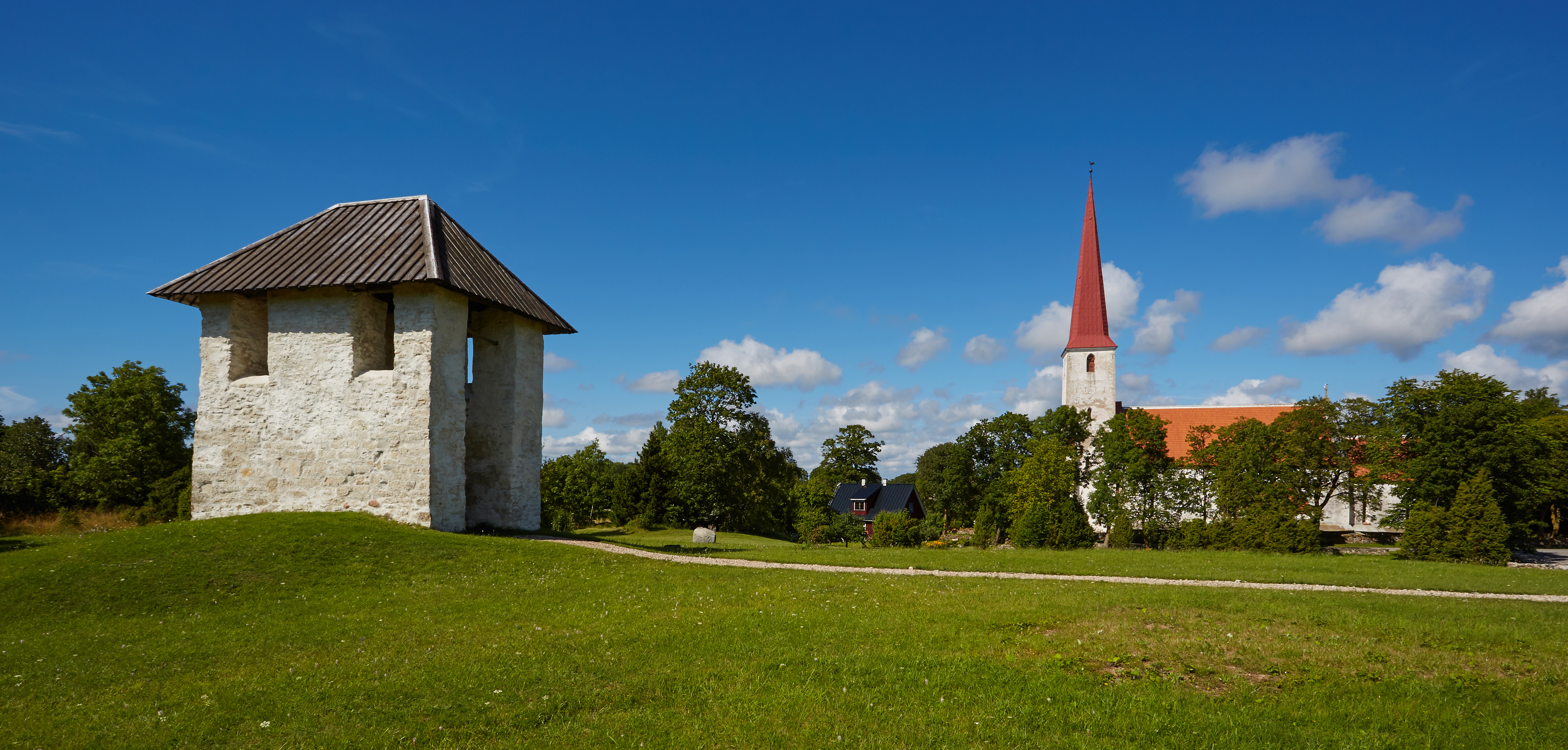
Kihelkonna bell tower and church in Saaremaa, Estonia. The bell tower was erected in 1638 and is the oldest bell tower in the Baltics that is situated separately from the church.

The church was founded sometime around 1250 as a joint undertaking by both the Livonian Order and the Bishopric of Ösel-Wiek as a part of crusader efforts to Christianise Estonia. The church was built at a strategic location, by a harbour of some importance and at a road connecting western Saaremaa with the rest of Estonia.

Originally, the church was designed to have a western tower but after a rebellion in 1260–1261, at which time the church was still unfinished, the plans were scrapped. The present-day tower only dates from 1899. Apart from the tower, the building of the church finished sometime in the later 1260s.

=== Architecture ===
Of the original medieval furnishing, very little remains. The interior is dominated by high, white-washed vaults. The altarpiece dates from 1591 and depicts the Last Supper.

The church has an organ and a carved epitaph dating from 1650 which was completed by the local carpenter Balthasar Raschky.

The exterior of the church is dominated by a neo-Gothic tower. The church also has an external bell-tower that was built 1638. Free-standing belfries were once quite common in Estonia; however, the one at Kihelkonna church is the only one still surviving.

== Images ==
Exterior door

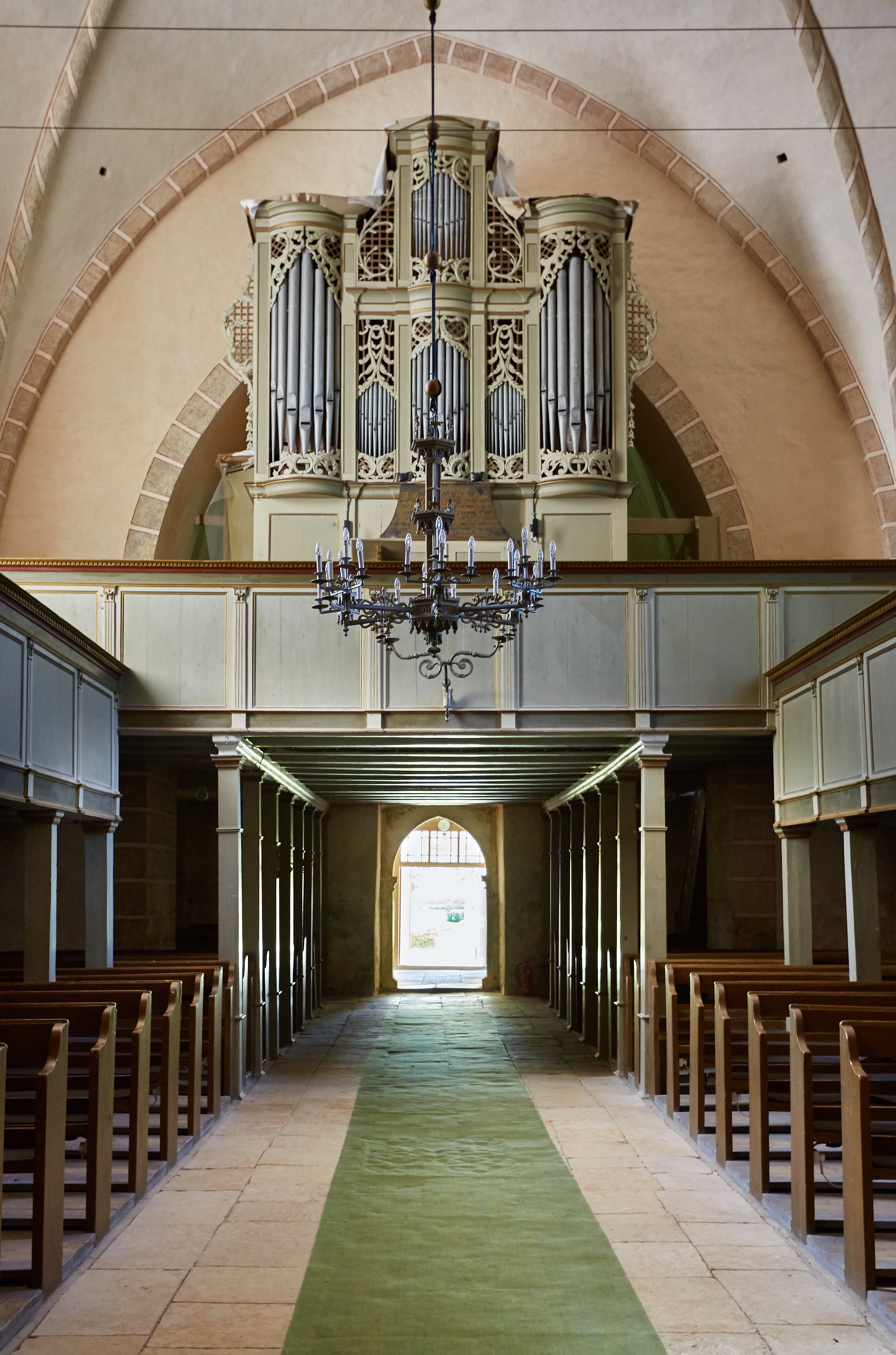
Interior towards door

Interior towards altar

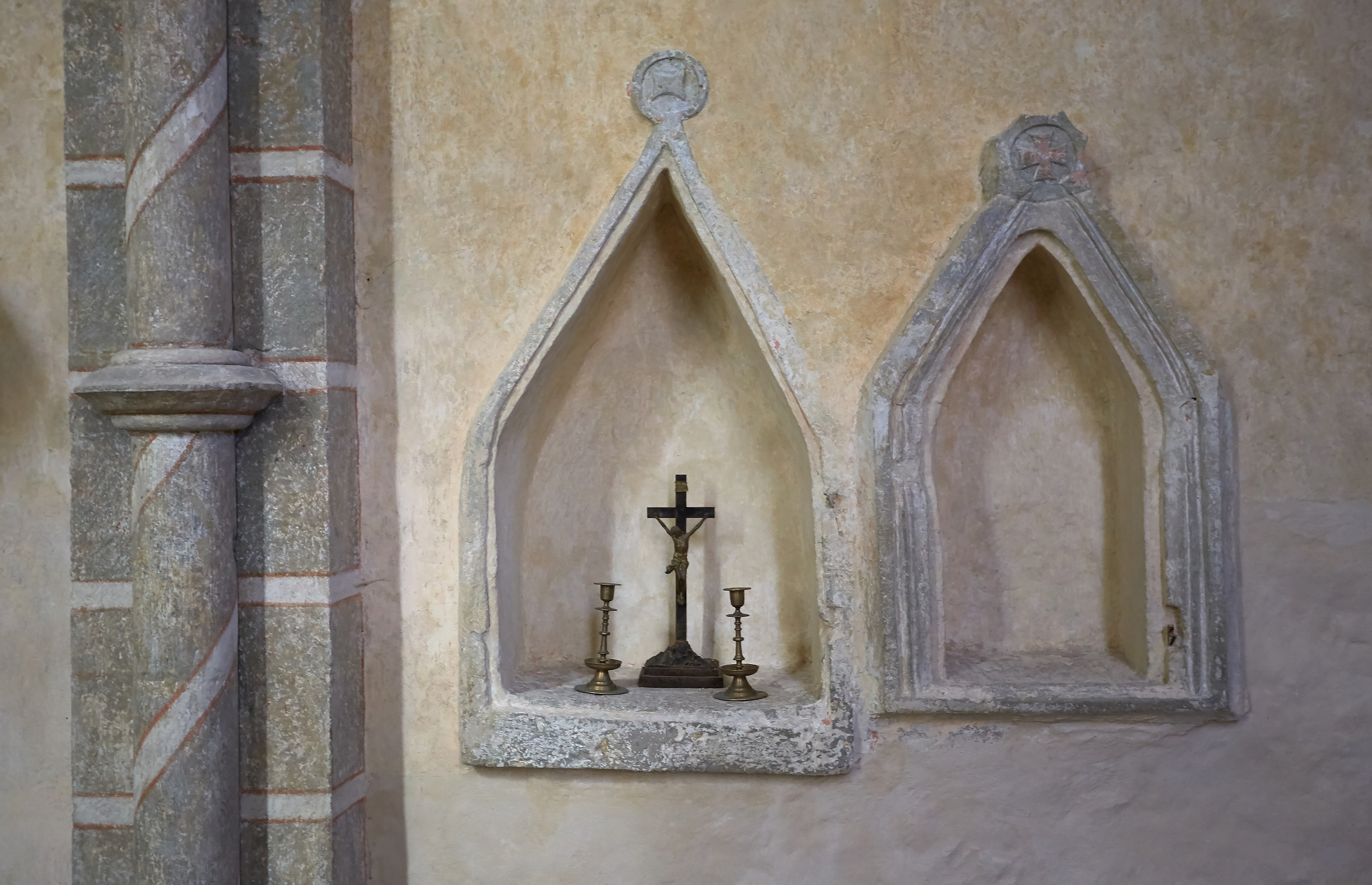
Interior detail

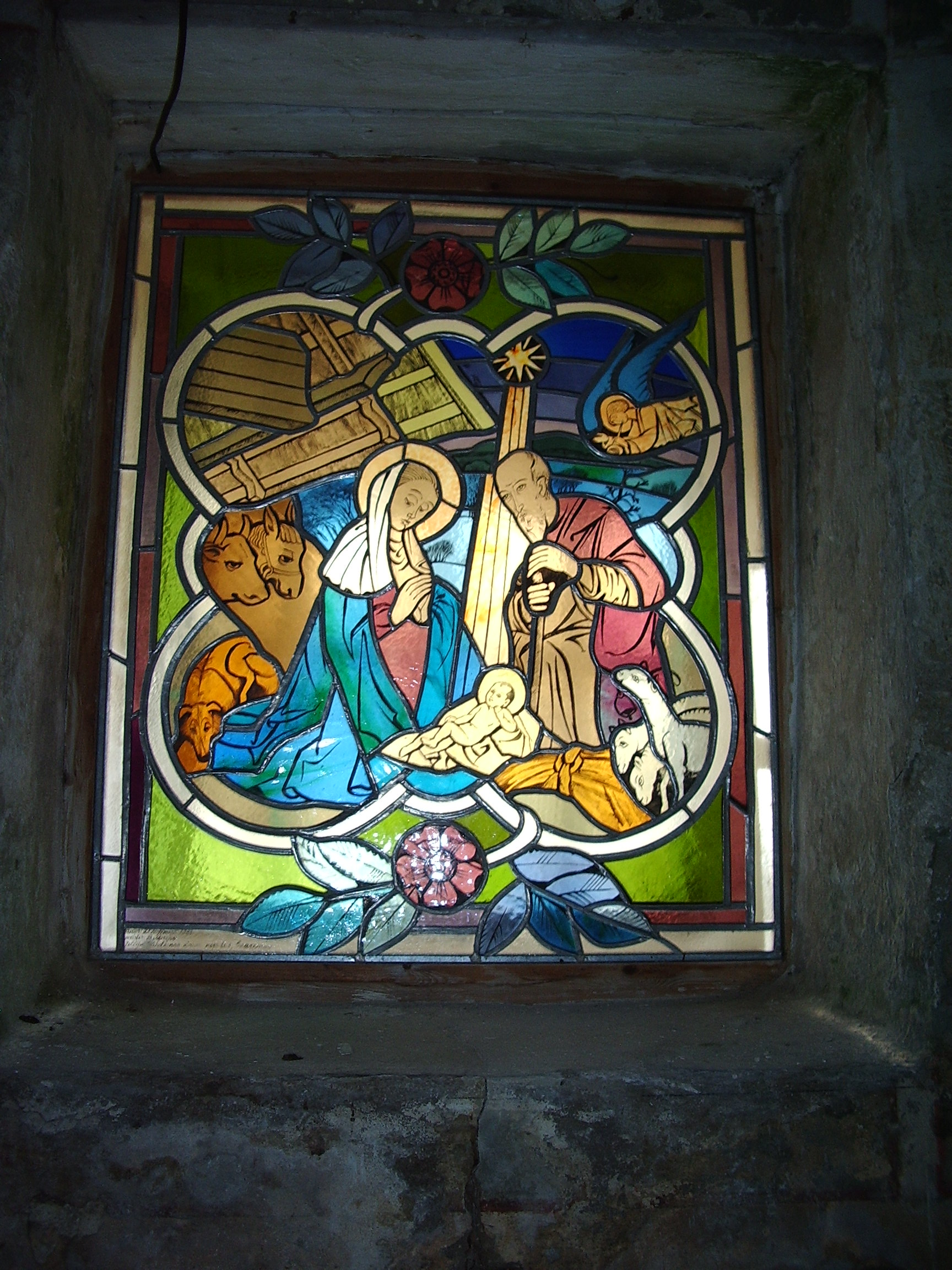
Interior window

== See also ==
- Architecture of Estonia
