= Linnaka =

Village in Estonia

Coordinates: 58°31′10″N 22°43′57″E

- Village
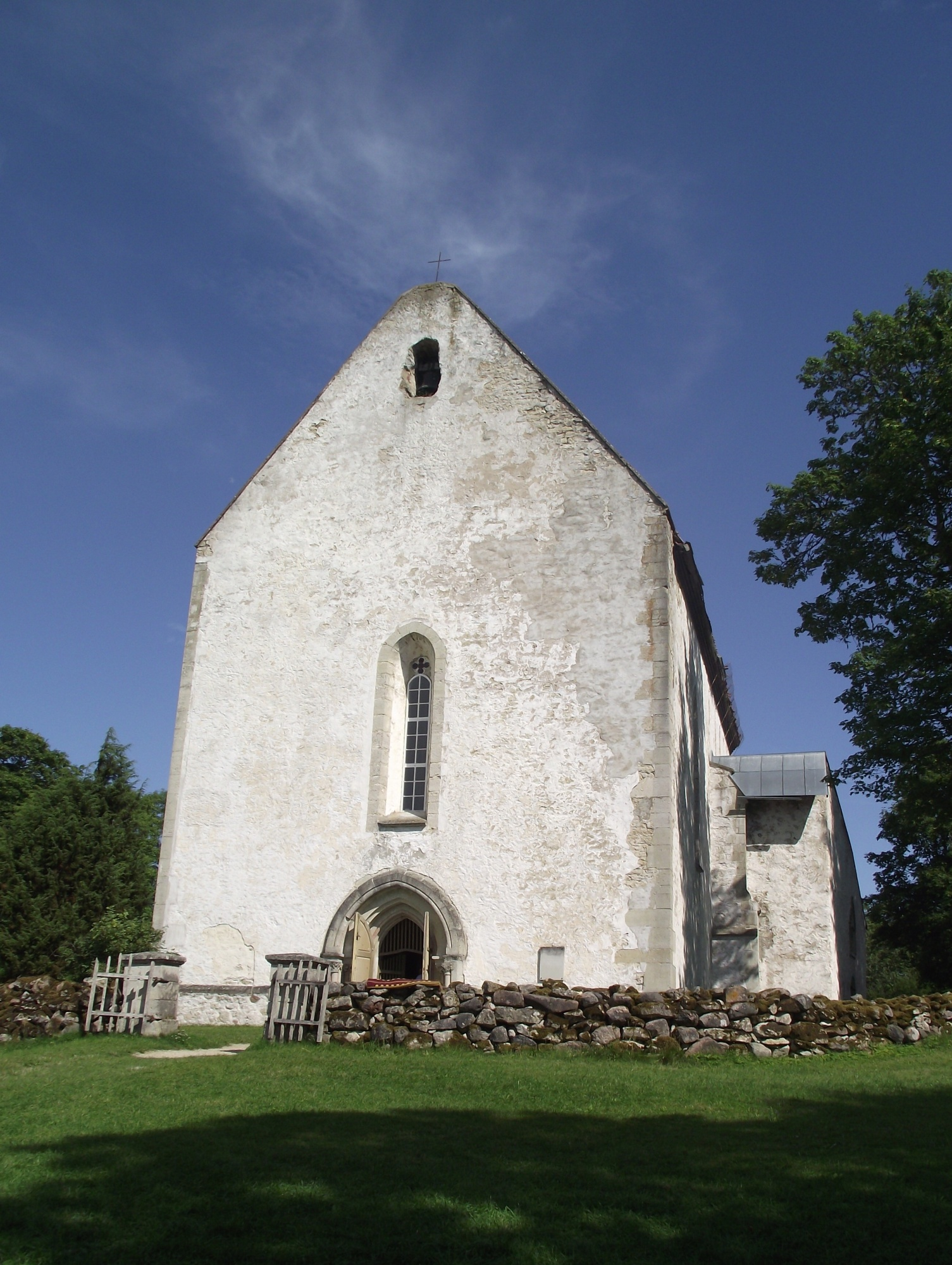
- Karja church in Linnaka village
- Interactive map of Linnaka
- Country: Estonia
- County: Saare County
- Parish: Saaremaa Parish
- Time zone: UTC+2 (EET)
  - Summer (DST): UTC+3 (EEST)

Linnaka is a village in Saaremaa Parish, Saare County in western Estonia.

Before the administrative reform in 2017, the village was in Leisi Parish.

Karja church, dating from the Middle Ages, is located in Linnaka.
