= Valjala Parish =

Former municipality of Estonia

Coordinates: 58.41°N 22.79°E

Valjala Parish Valjala vald
- Former municipality
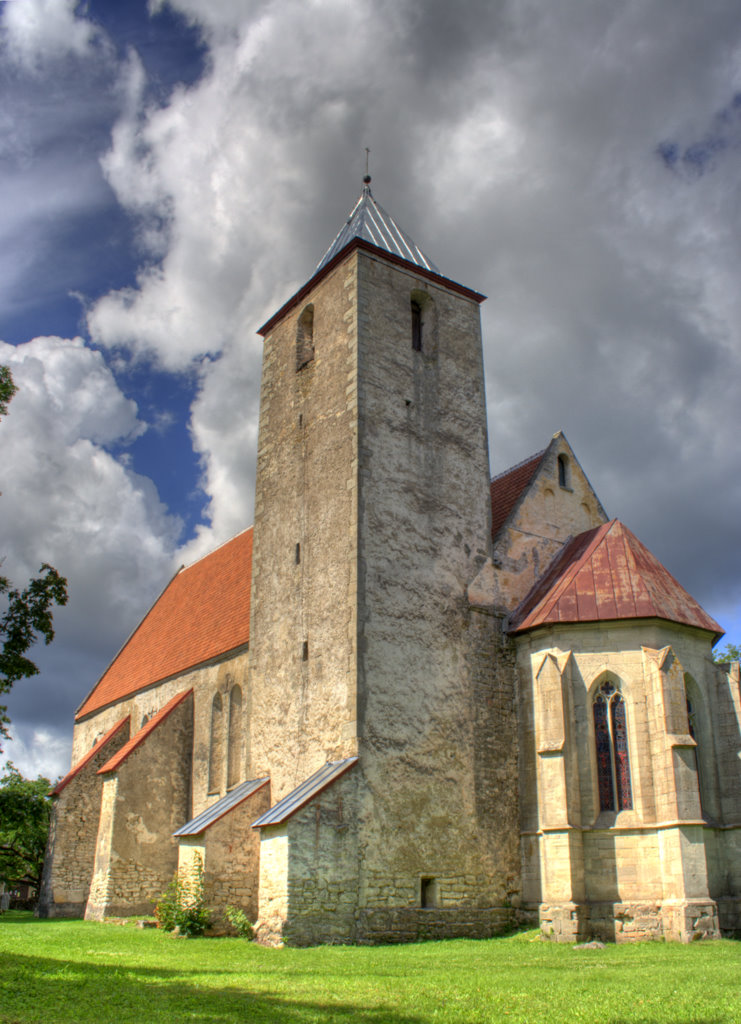
- Valjala church

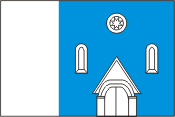
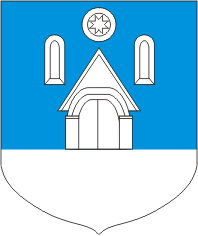
- Flag Coat of arms

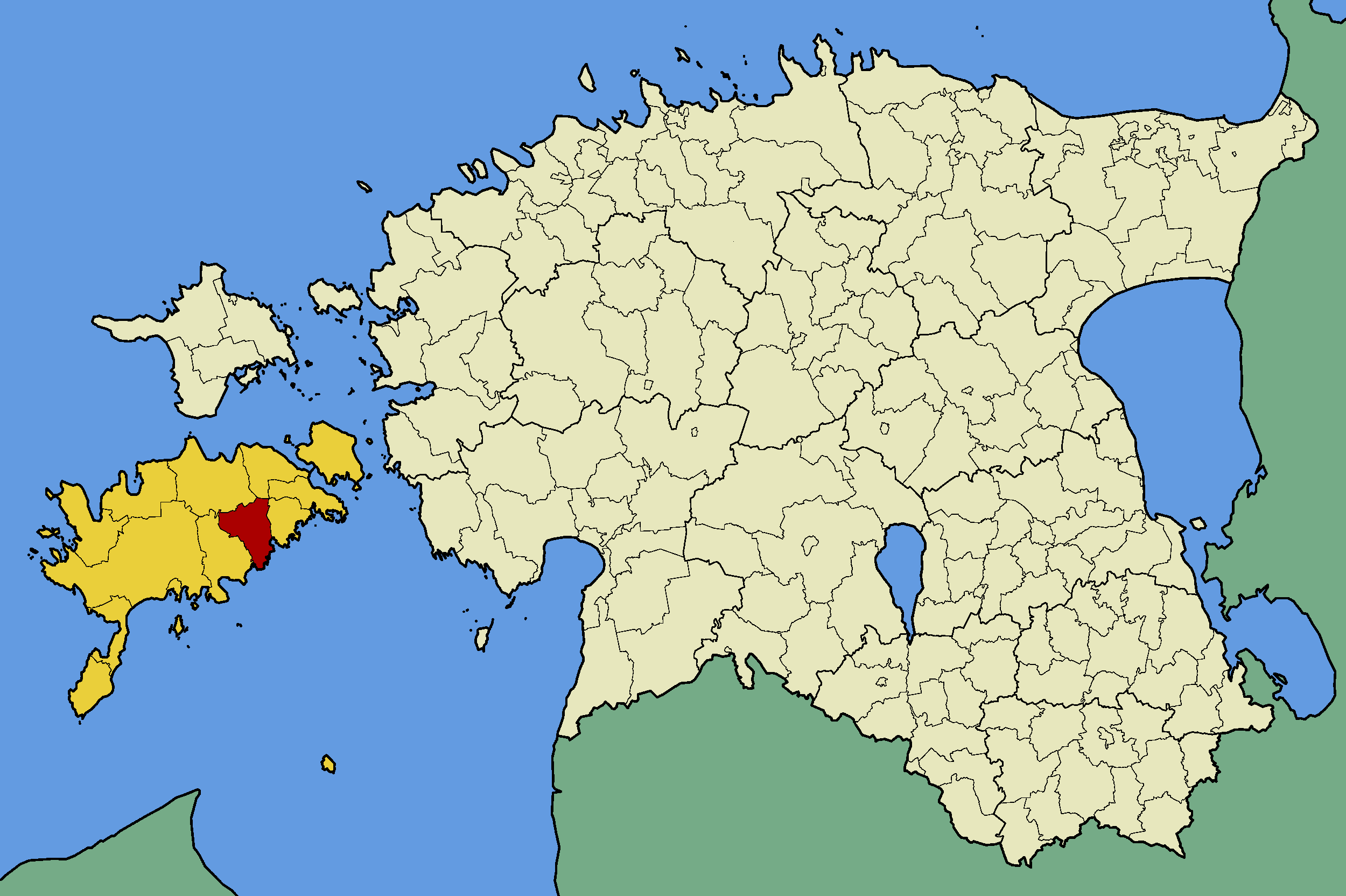
- Valjala Parish within Saare County.
- Country: Estonia
- County: Saare County
- Administrative centre: Valjala

Government
  - Mayor: Aare Martinson

Area
  - Total: 180.02 km^{2} (69.51 sq mi)

Population (01.01.2012)
  - Total: 1,406
  - Density: 7.810/km^{2} (20.23/sq mi)
- Website: www.valjala.ee

Valjala Parish (or Valjala rural municipality) was a rural municipality in western Estonia. It is a part of Saare County. The municipality had a population of 1,397 (as of 1 January 2006) and covered an area of 180.02 km^{2}.

During the administrative-territorial reform in 2017, all 12 municipalities on the island Saaremaa were merged into a single municipality – Saaremaa Parish.

== Location ==
Valjala Parish was situated between Laimjala Parish (east), Pihtla Parish (west) and Leisi Parish (north).

== Villages and boroughs ==
The parish consisted of one small borough, Valjala, and 32 villages: Ariste, Jursi, Jõelepa, Jööri, Kalju, Kallemäe, Kalli, Kogula, Koksi, Kuiste, Kungla, Kõnnu, Kõriska, Lööne, Männiku, Nurme, Oessaare, Põlluküla, Rahu, Rannaküla, Röösa, Sakla, Siiksaare, Turja, Tõnija, Undimäe, Vanalõve, Veeriku, Vilidu, Võrsna, Väkra, Väljaküla.

=== Other features ===
The parish had 2 schools, kindergarten, and several manors.

The oldest sacral building in Estonia is Valjala church. The construction began in 1227.

Parish included ruins of ancient Valjala Stronghold.

== See also ==
- Municipalities of Estonia
