= Torgu Parish =

Municipality of Estonia

Coordinates: 57°58′33″N 22°05′15″E

Torgu Parish Torgu vald
- Former municipality of Estonia
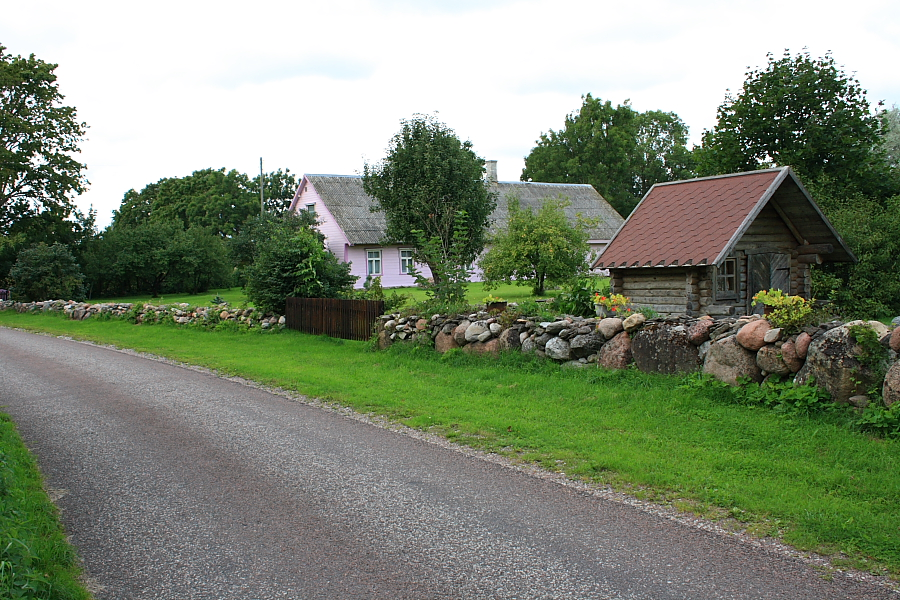
- Farmhouse in Laadla village

- Flag Coat of arms

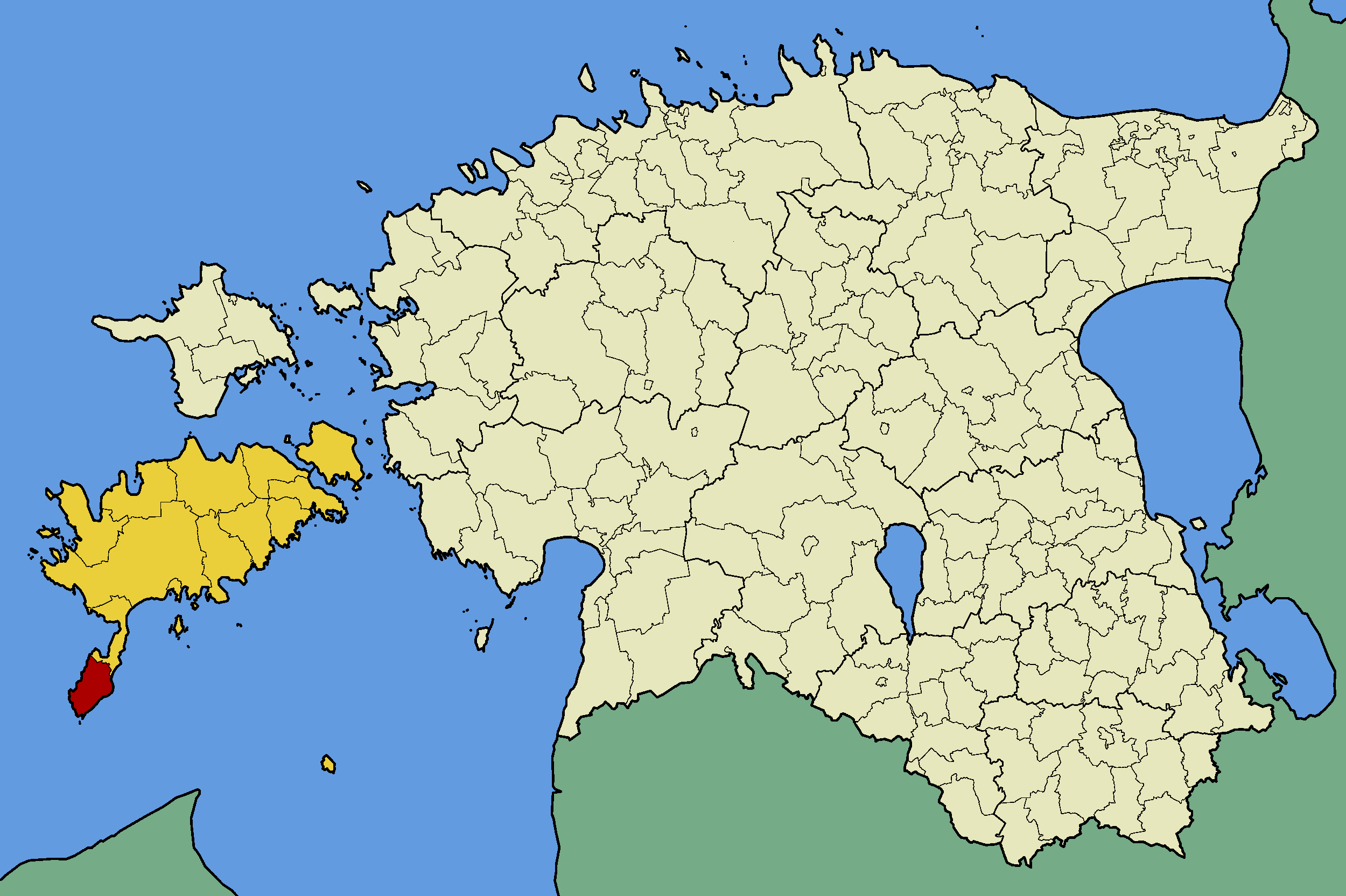
- Torgu Parish within Saare County.
- Country: Estonia
- County: Saare County
- Administrative centre: Iide

Area
  - Total: 126.44 km^{2} (48.82 sq mi)

Population (01.01.2006)
  - Total: 375
  - Density: 2.97/km^{2} (7.68/sq mi)

Torgu Parish was a rural municipality at the tip of the Sõrve Peninsula on the island of Saaremaa in western Estonia. It is a part of Saare County.

This parish consisted of 22 villages. The municipality had a population of 375 (as of 1 January 2006) and covered an area of 126.44 km^{2}.

During the administrative-territorial reform in 2017, all 12 municipalities on the island Saaremaa were merged into a single municipality – Saaremaa Parish.

The Parish has achieved notoriety when it was claimed by a micronation known as the Kingdom of Torgu in 1992.

== Kingdom of Torgu ==
Flag of the Kingdom of Torgu

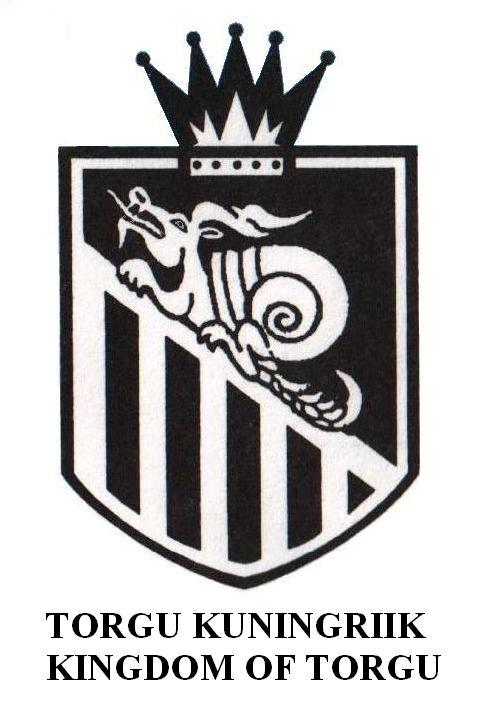
Coat of Arms of the Kingdom of Torgu

In 1989, during the Soviet period, there was a move to reform the largely arbitrary municipal borders that the Soviets had drawn. This led to the separation of the Torgu Parish from the Salme Parish in 1989, at the initiative of the frivolous Independent Royalist Party of Estonia.

After Estonian independence, the Supreme Council of the Republic of Estonia decided to clarify the administrative divisions within the borders of Estonia, however Torgu was only mentioned when clarifying that it was not a part of Salme, so Torgu was not officially described as Estonian territory

"To confirm, as an exception, the self-governing status of Salme parish within its current administrative territory, excluding the territory of the former Torgu Parish, and to establish this status as of 30 July 1992."

In response, local leaders in Torgu such as Leevi Häng, Laine Tarvis, Valdek Kaus, and Leo Filippov decided to form their own Kingdom called the “Kingdom of Estonia” on 4 September 1992 and later crowning member of the 7th Riigikogu and Independent Royalist Party member Kirill Teiter (self-styled as Kirill I) as their first king on 28 November 1992. Torgu's status as a part of Estonia was resolved in 1993 and Torgu officially became a parish of Estonia. The Kingdom however, maintained operations, including minting its own currency, the Torgu Thaler, and making its own flag, based on the Estonian Flag, and the Nordic Cross.

Teiter died on 20 May 2022 and a referendum was held to elect a new king. Kirill Teiter's son, Kristian Teiter won the referendum and was elected as the second king of Torgu, Kristian I on 12 August 2022.

== Villages ==
Hänga - Iide - Jämaja - Kaavi - Kargi - Karuste - Kaunispe - Laadla - Läbara - Lindmetsa - Lõupõllu - Lülle - Maantee - Mäebe - Mässa - Mõisaküla - Mõntu - Ohessaare - Sääre - Soodevahe - Tammuna - Türju

== See also ==
- Municipalities of Estonia
