= Mõisaküla (disambiguation) =

Mõisaküla ("manor village") may refer to several places in Estonia:

- Mõisaküla, town in Mulgi Parish, Viljandi County
- Mõisaküla, Harju County, village in Kiili Parish, Harju County
- Mõisaküla, Jõgeva County, village in Põltsamaa Parish, Jõgeva County
- Mõisaküla, Lääne-Nigula Parish, village in Lääne-Nigula Parish, Lääne County
- Mõisaküla, Lääneranna Parish, village in Lääneranna Parish, Pärnu County
- Mõisaküla, Põhja-Pärnumaa Parish, village in Põhja-Pärnumaa Parish, Pärnu County
- Mõisaküla, Saaremaa Parish, village in Saaremaa Parish, Saare County
- Mõisaküla, Muhu Parish, village in Muhu Parish, Saare County
- Mõisaküla, Salme Parish, former village in Salme Parish, Saare County, now part of Kaugatoma village
- Torgu-Mõisaküla, village in Saaremaa Parish, Saare County, formerly known as Mõisaküla in Torgu Parish
