= Siplase Nature Reserve =

Estonian nature reserve

- Interactive map of Siplase Nature Reserve
- Location: Estonia
- Coordinates: 57.9833°N 22.1°E
- Area: 207 hectares (510 acres)
- Established: 2007

Siplase Nature Reserve is a nature reserve which is located in Saare County, Estonia.

The area of the nature reserve is 207 hectares (510 acres).

The protected area was founded in 2007 to protect valuable habitat types and threatened species in Iide, Mõisaküla and Soodevahe village (all in former Torgu Parish).
