= Kalli Landscape Conservation Area =

Protected area in Estonia

- Location within Estonia
- Location: Estonia
- Coordinates: 58°23′N 22°55′E
- Area: 480 ha (1,200 acres)
- Established: 2007

Kalli Landscape Conservation Area is a nature park is located in Saare County, Estonia.

Its area is 480 ha.

The protected area was founded in 2007 to protect representative fens and springs areas and adjacent natural and seminatural communities located in villages of Kalli, Kallemäe, Tõnija and Rannaküla.
