= Kellamäe =

Kellamäe mäy refer to several places in Estonia:

- Kellamäe, Lääne-Viru County, village in Väike-Maarja Parish, Lääne-Viru County
- Kellamäe, Saare County, village in Saaremaa Parish, Saare County
- Kellämäe, village in Rõuge Parish, Võru County

== See also ==
- Kallemäe, village in Saaremaa Parish, Saare County
