= Lindmetsa Landscape Conservation Area =

Protected area in Estonia

- Location within Estonia
- Location: Estonia
- Coordinates: 58°03′00″N 22°04′30″E
- Area: 51 ha (130 acres)
- Established: 2007

Lindmetsa Landscape Conservation Area is a nature park is located in Saare County, Estonia.

Its area is 51 ha.

The protected area was founded in 2007 to protect forest dunes (Estonian: metsastunud luitealad) of Kaunispe and Lindmetsa village.
