= Kogula =

Kogula may refer to several places in Estonia:

- Kogula, Saaremaa Parish, village in Saaremaa Parish, Saare County (formerly in Kärla Parish)
- Valjala-Kogula, village in Saaremaa Parish, Saare County (formerly in Valjala Parish, known as Kogula until 2017)
