= Kungla =

Kungla may refer to:

- Kungla, Lääne-Saare Parish, village in Lääne-Saare Parish, Saare County, Estonia
- Kungla, Valjala Parish, village in Valjala Parish, Saare County, Estonia
- Korporatsioon Kungla, fraternal organization of Estonian higher education students, operated from 1924 to 1927.
- Kungla tänav, popular streetname in Estonia
