= Iide =

Iide may refer to:

- Iide, Yamagata, town in Nishiokitama District, Yamagata, Japan
- Iide, Estonia, village in Saaremaa Parish, Saare County, Estonia
- Paulo Iide, Brazilian entomologist
