= Independent Royalist Party of Estonia =

Estonian political party

Estonian Royalist Party Eesti Rojalistik Partei
- Leader: Kalle Kulbok
- Registered: 1989
- Dissolved: October 1998
- Ideology: political satire joke party populism

The Estonian Royalist Party (Estonian: Eesti Rojalistik Partei, ERP) also known as Independent Royalists (Estonian: Sõltumatud Kunningriiklased, SK) was a frivolous political party in Estonia founded in 1989 by Estonian humorists and satirists and opperated until 1998 after failing to meet the 1,000 member requirement for registration. The party advocated for the transformation of Estonia into a monarchy. Two proposed candidates for the throne included Prince Edward, of the United Kingdom and Prince Carl Philip, of Sweden

The party, widely considered a humorous expression of protest, was successful in the 1992 Estonian parliamentary elections, with 32,638 votes, gaining eight seats in the parliament (Riigikogu). Its most prominent members were known humorists Priit Aimla, Kirill Teiter and Ralf Parve, and the party was led by Kalle Kulbok.

The party's official programme called for establishing Estonia as a monarchy, as modeled by Sweden and Norway. In 1994 they asked Prince Edward, of the United Kingdom, to be crowned King of Estonia, as he was far enough down the line of succession and fairly popular; Buckingham Palace politely declined the request, stating it was "a charming idea, but a rather unlikely one".

In practice, the party's main achievement was consistent ridicule of laws its members found ridiculous, for example, getting rid of the proposed hour of prayer in the parliament by repeatedly performing a stylized "Neopagan" rite, complete with tambourine. The party also performed an "eating strike", as opposed to the simultaneous hunger strikes by some pro-Russian politicians.

Party member Kirill Teiter became the King of a micronation known as the Kingdom of Torgu in 1992.

== List of members who served in Riigikogu ==
- Priit Aimla
- Tõnu Kõrda
- Lembit Küüts
- Mihkel Kraav
- Vambola Põder
- Rein Kikerpill
- Kalle Kulbok
- Ralf Parve
- Vilja Savisaar
- Kirill Teiter
