= Põlluküla =

Põlluküla may refer to several places in Estonia:

- Põlluküla, Lääne-Saare Parish, village in Lääne-Saare Parish, Saare County
- Põlluküla, Valjala Parish, village in Valjala Parish, Saare County
