= Laadla =

Laadla may refer to:

- Laadla, Saare County, Estonia
- Ladla, a 1954 Indian Hindi-language film
- Laadla (1966 film), an Indian Hindi-language film
- Laadla (1994 film), an Indian Hindi-language film
- Laadla, a 2015 Indian Bhojpuri-language film
  - Laadla 2, its 2023 sequel
