= Kalle Kulbok =

Estonian politician (born 1956)

Kalle Kulbok (born 3 April 1956 in Tallinn) is an Estonian politician.

== Education ==
Kulbok attended the Nõo Gymnasium and achieved good results on national olympiads of mathematics. By his skills, he could have qualified for the all-Union olympiad of mathematics; however, due to his displayed lack of respect for Soviet politics, he was never selected for that round.

== Politics ==
In 1992–1995, Kulbok belonged to Riigikogu as a member of the Independent Royalist Party of Estonia. In 1995, Kulbok was not allowed to run for Riigikogu because he refused to swear allegiance to Republic of Estonia.

In later years, his political activity has mainly involved Euroskepticism. He's earned notoriety by several interesting actions, most notably by having himself pilloried for failure to derail Estonia's entry to European Union, and his declaration of revocation of his Estonian citizenship. As of 2007, Kulbok is the only natural-born citizen of Estonia known to have voluntarily requested revocation of his citizenship without naturalising in another country.

On 19 September 2003, Kulbok petitioned the Supreme Court of Estonia to declare the referendum for Estonia's joining European Union unconstitutional. The Supreme Court refused to consider the matter, arguing that only President of Estonia can rightfully present such a petition.

== Career ==
For many years, Kulbok worked as a specialist at EENet.
