= Kirill Teiter =

Estonian politician (1952–2022)

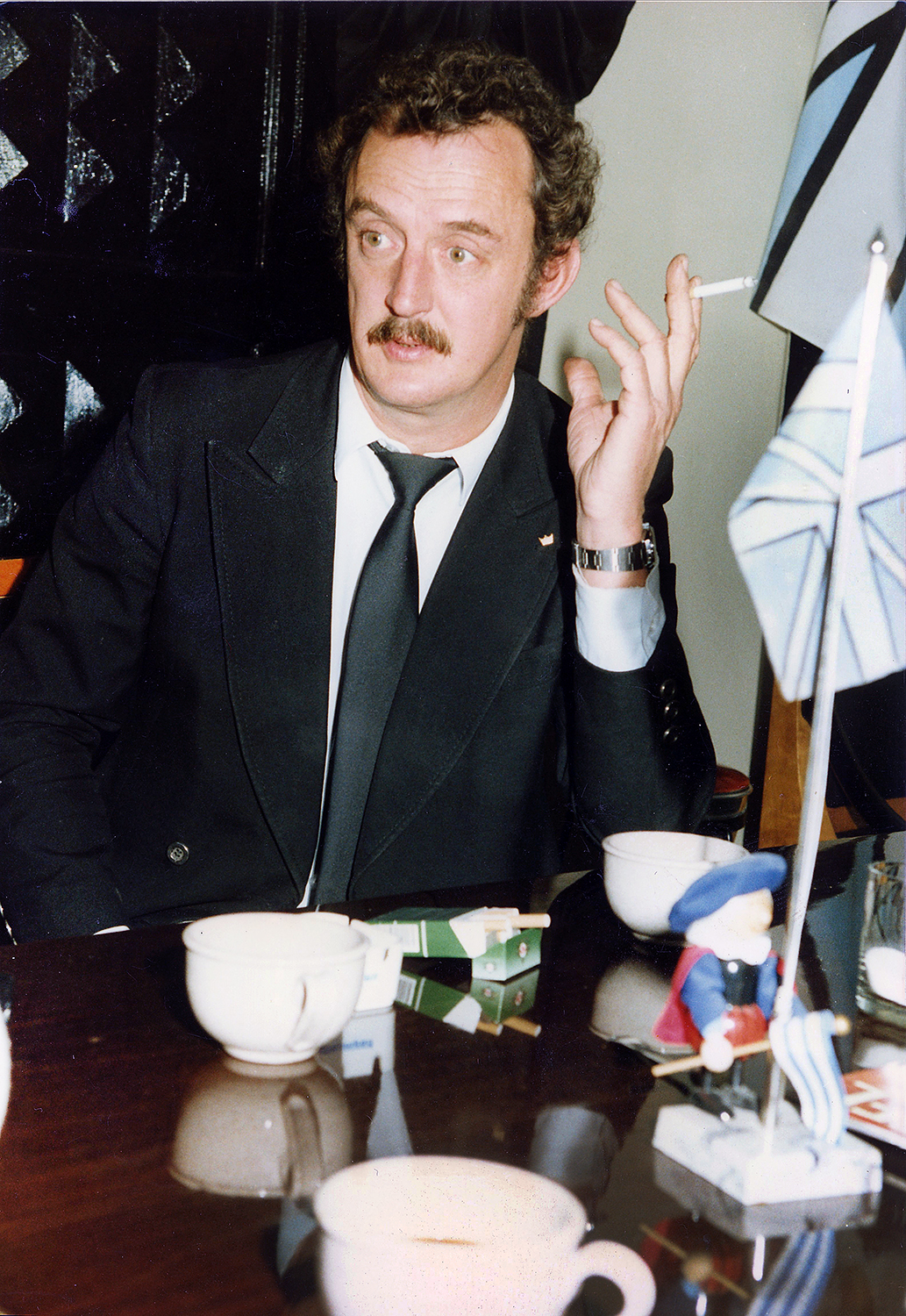
- Teiter in 1992

King of Torgu (Micronation)
- Reign: 8 September 1992 – 20 May 2022
- Coronation: 28 November 1992
- Predecessor: Position established
- Successor: Kristian Teiter
- Born: Kirill Teiter; 25 August 1952; Tallinn, Estonia
- Died: 20 May 2022 (aged 69)
- Spouse: Imbi Teiter
- Issue: Kristian I

Kirill Teiter (25 August 1952 – 20 May 2022), self-styled as Kirill I was an Estonian politician and humorist, as well as the first king of the unrecognized micronation known as the Kingdom of Torgu. Teiter was born in Tallinn on 25 August 1952. He was a member of VII Riigikogu as part of the Royalist Party. Teiter died on 20 May 2022, aged 69.
