= Väkra =

Village in Estonia

- Village
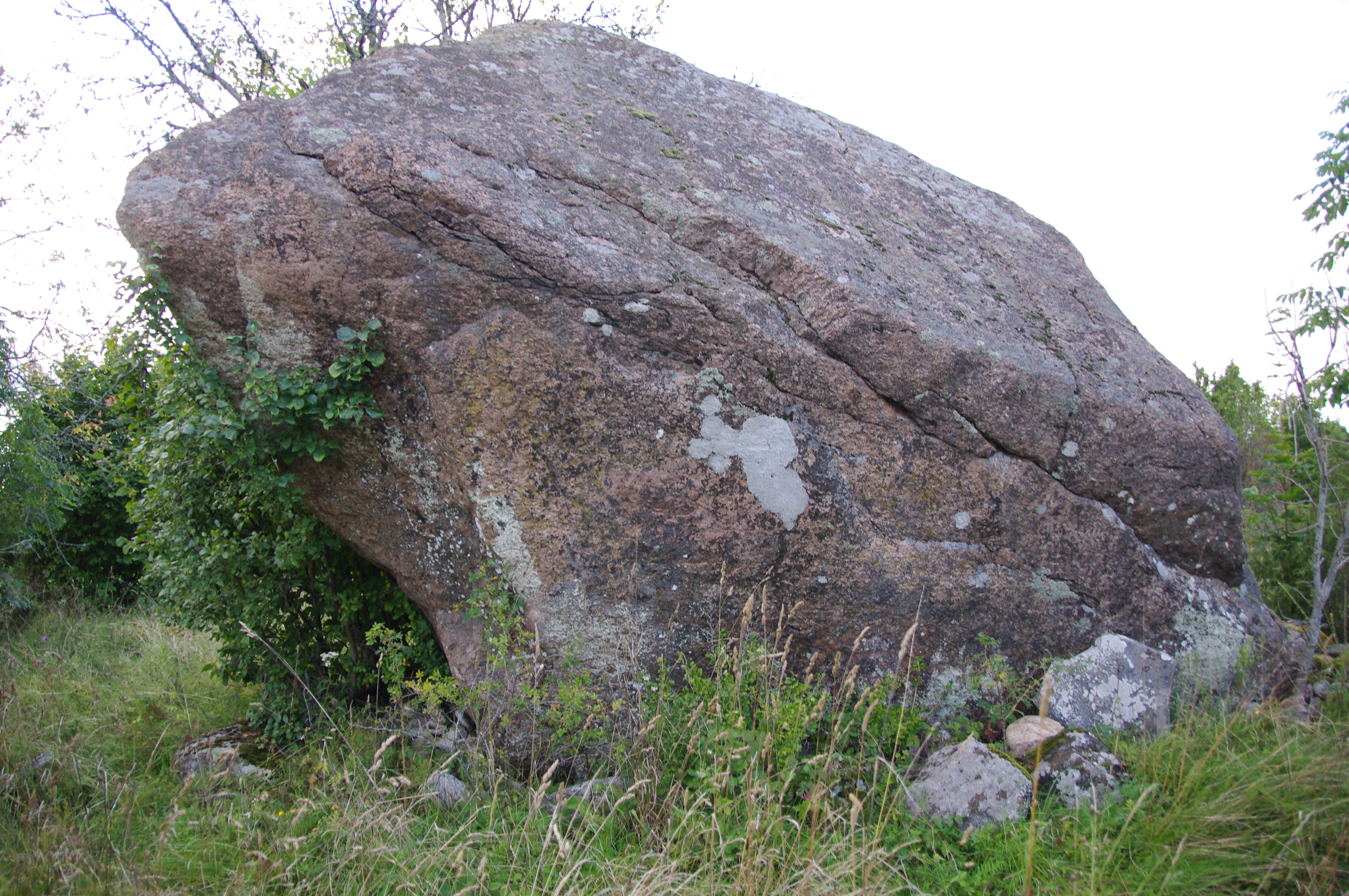
- Väkra Hiiekivi

- Location in Estonia
- Coordinates: 58°27′29″N 22°50′01″E
- Country: Estonia
- County: Saare County
- Municipality: Saaremaa Parish

Population (2011 Census)
  - Total: 0

Väkra is an uninhabited village in Saaremaa Parish, Saare County, Estonia, on the island of Saaremaa.

Before the Estonian local government administrative reform in 2017, the village was part of Valjala municipality.
