= Valjala Stronghold =

Castle in Estonia

Valjala
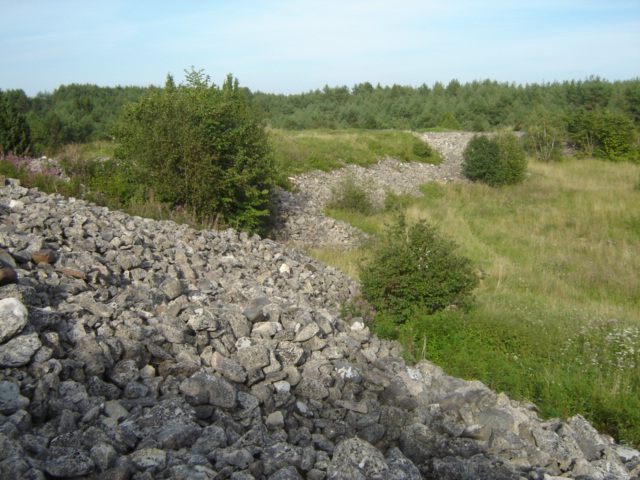
- Remnants of Valjala Stronghold

- Location of the site in Estonia
- 58°23′59″N 22°47′41″E
- Type: Ringfort
- Location: Saare County, Estonia

History
- Built: 12th century
- Abandoned: c. 13th century

Site notes
- Condition: Ruins

The Valjala Stronghold (Latin: Castrum Waldia, Estonian: Valjala Maalinn) was a major ringfort on the island of Saaremaa in Estonia. Established in the 12th century, at the time it was the most important Oeselian stronghold. Its surrender in 1227 finalized the crusader conquest of Estonia.

The surroundings of Valjala hillfort consist mostly of marshland. Higher ground extends for approximately 200 metres northeast of the hillfort, along the present-day road. A thin cultural layer has been discovered there, remaining from the former “town.” It was not an actual town, but rather a seasonal gathering place.

== Location and layout ==
The stronghold is located about 700 m (2,300 ft) south from Valjala. It is slightly oval shaped, having a diameter about 120 m (390 ft) by 110 m (360 ft). The height of the walls is 3–6 m (9.8–19.7 ft) inside and 5–8 m (16–26 ft) outside. The courtyard includes a limestone-lined well.

== History ==
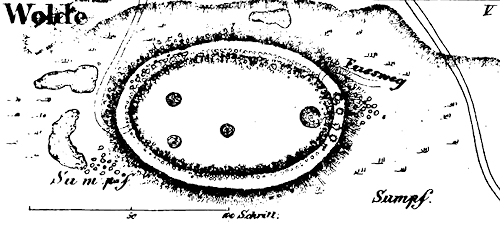
Schematic of the stronghold by Friedrich Kruse

The Valjala Stronghold was founded in the 12th century, and by the time of the crusades had become the main fortress of the island of Saaremaa. It was a ringfort with a courtyard area of 3,600 m^{2} (39,000 sq ft), and the only stone castle on Saaremaa. The nearby Lõve River was an actively used waterway for the Oeselians.

Henry of Livonia referred to the leaders of Valjala as nobiles, a term usually reserved for the Western European nobility. He also stressed the stronghold's importance, describing it as follows:

... fort, called Waldia, in the midst of Oesel. Waldia is the strongest city among all those of the Oeselians.

In January 1227 the Livonian Brothers of the Sword organized a major invasion against Saaremaa, marching an army of 20,000 men over the frozen sea. The stronghold of Muhu was attacked first and completely destroyed. The crusader army then laid siege to Valjala, plundering the island in the process. The defenders of the Valjala Stronghold surrendered and accepted Christianity. This surrender concluded the crusaders’ conquest of Estonia. A mass baptism was organized and a stone chapel was built about 1 km (0.62 mi) northwest from the stronghold, marking the starting point of the sacred architectural history in Estonia.

== Excavations ==
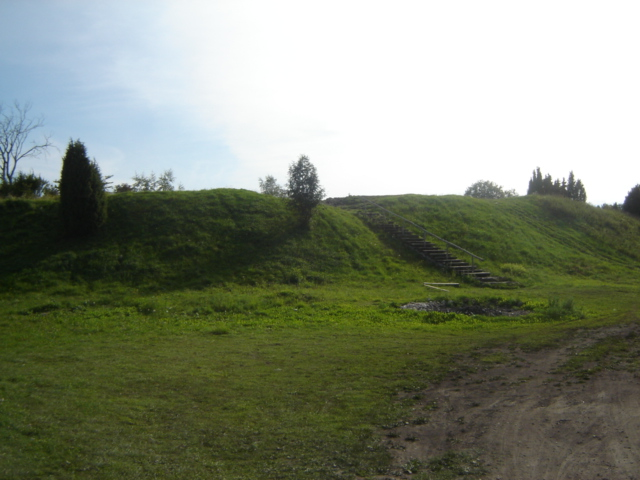
Remnants of the stronghold

Stray finds from Valjala hillfort include a sword hilt decorated with silver inlay and punched ornamentation, as well as spearheads and arrowheads. Excavations have also yielded brooches, dress pins, pottery, and other household items dating to the 11th–13th centuries.

The first investigations at Valjala hillfort were conducted in the 1860s under the direction of Jean Baptiste Holzmayer. According to descriptions, the excavations revealed a chamber with stone walls in the rampart, which may have been used for storage.

In 1895, excavations at Valjala hillfort were carried out by the Moscow archaeologist Sergei K. Bogojavlenski and the landlord Stackelberg.

Between 1962 and 1964, archaeological research at the site was led by Aita Kustin. Her investigations clarified the construction of the ramparts and examined the remains of buildings with stoves. It became evident that the interior of the fort had been densely built up - excavations uncovered the remains of at least eight wooden buildings. Numerous artefacts were found, mainly dating from the early 12th century to around the 1260s. During this period, Valjala hillfort was actively used, with some inhabitants residing there year-round. A well 5.34 metres deep, lined with timber framing, was also excavated. Fifteen finds were recovered from the well, including a wooden shovel, an axe, and a birch-bark container.

From 2021 to 2024, excavations at Valjala hillfort and its surroundings were conducted by foundation Osiliana. As indicated by these excavations, the area of the hillfort was already in some kind of use in the 5th–6th centuries. The earliest occupation was probably connected in some way with another fortification 700 m east-northeast of the fortress, the Valjala old ring-fort.

== Construction phases ==
A more intensive period of human activity in the area of the later Valjala hill-fort began in the second half of the 11th century. Probably at the beginning of the 12th century, a fortification system consisting of three ramparts was built. To access the hillfort’s courtyard, people had to pass through the surrounding “town”, and navigate through at least three gates.

The outer rampart was almost circular in shape, with a diameter of 186–193 m. A few dozen metres towards the centre of the fortification system was wall 2, which was probably oval in shape and is still partially visible on LiDAR maps at the foot of the main hill-fort. The walls 1 and 2 were not very strong, with stone walls about 2m wide and 2m high, probably topped by an additional timber facade.

The innermost rampart was more powerful than the others. It was originally built as a stone rampart with large log boxes on top that were filled with smaller stones. Throughout the 12th century, the central fort was rebuilt several times. Rampart made entirely of dry-laid stones were erected, reaching heights of 10 metres or more. The walls of the ramparts were made of limestone broken from a quarry, and covered with clay plaster. Inside the hillfort, remnants of the stone walls are still visible, while the exterior is covered by earthworks from later periods. In 2022, during excavations led by Foundation Osiliana, a section of the outer stone wall was briefly uncovered.

The central fort of Valjala must have been an exceptionally powerful sight in the 12th century. It was significantly larger and taller than the first mortar-bound stone fortresses that emerged in Livonia towards the end of the century, not to mention the first small stone churches. It was nearly impregnable – indeed, there is no record of it ever being conquered. Moreover, it served as a symbol of the power of local lords. The 12th-century islanders, who controlled the eastern sea routes of the Baltic, were feared opponents to all seafarers.

At the end of the 12th century, the lower part of the stone wall was covered with soil. This was probably done for practical reasons. The Livonian Crusaders had brought with them a modern siege technique – the catapults – with which thrown stones could easily damage the stone wall if it was not bound with mortar. To avoid this, an additional mound of earth was piled up.

Around the 1260s, Valjala hillfort was abandoned. After a few decades, the stone wall began to deteriorate. However, around this time, probably in the first half of the 14th century, the last major fortification work of the Valjala hillfort was undertaken. A new embankment – still visible today – was constructed on the outer side of the central fort.

An additional earthwork was needed to allow a timber fortification to be erected on the roof of the wall, next to the crumbling stone wall. Similarly, the concentric wall surrounding the fort was additionally fortified by piling earth on top of the old stone wall and erecting a log fence on top. Today, this outer rampart is discernible as a low ridge, from which stones and soil were extracted for construction projects elsewhere in the early 20th century.

We can assume that the final fortification of Valjala hillfort was connected to the St. George’s Night Uprising. According to the chronicles, the islanders built a strong concentric log wall and an impregnable log fort within it. In 1344, the Teutonic Order succeeded in breaking through the outer concentric wall and killed many inside, but this did not result in a victory and they did not take the central fort. Nonetheless, they succeeded in capturing and executing Vesse, the king of the islanders who defended the wall.

== See also ==
- Varbola Stronghold
- Ancient Estonia

== Bibliography ==
- Mägi, Marika (2004). ""…Ships are their main strength." Harbour sites, arable lands and chieftains on Saaremaa". Estonian Journal of Archaeology. 8 (2). Estonian Academy Publishers.
- Raukas, Anto; Bauert, Heikki; Willman, Sebastian; Puurmann, Elle; Ratas, Urve (2009). Geotourism highlights of the Saaremaa and Hiiumaa islands (PDF). Geoguide Baltoscandia. ISBN 9789985997314.
- Tamm, Marek; Kaljundi, Linda (2016). Crusading and Chronicle Writing on the Medieval Baltic Frontier: A Companion to the Chronicle of Henry of Livonia. Routledge. ISBN 9781317156796.
- Taylor, Neil (2014). Estonia. Bradt Travel Guides. ISBN 9781841624877.
- Valk, Heiki (2014). "The Fate of Final Iron Age Strongholds of Estonia: struggle for power and transition to the Middle Ages". Muinasaja teadus. 24. ISSN 1406-3867.
