= Ralf R. Parve =

Estonian politician

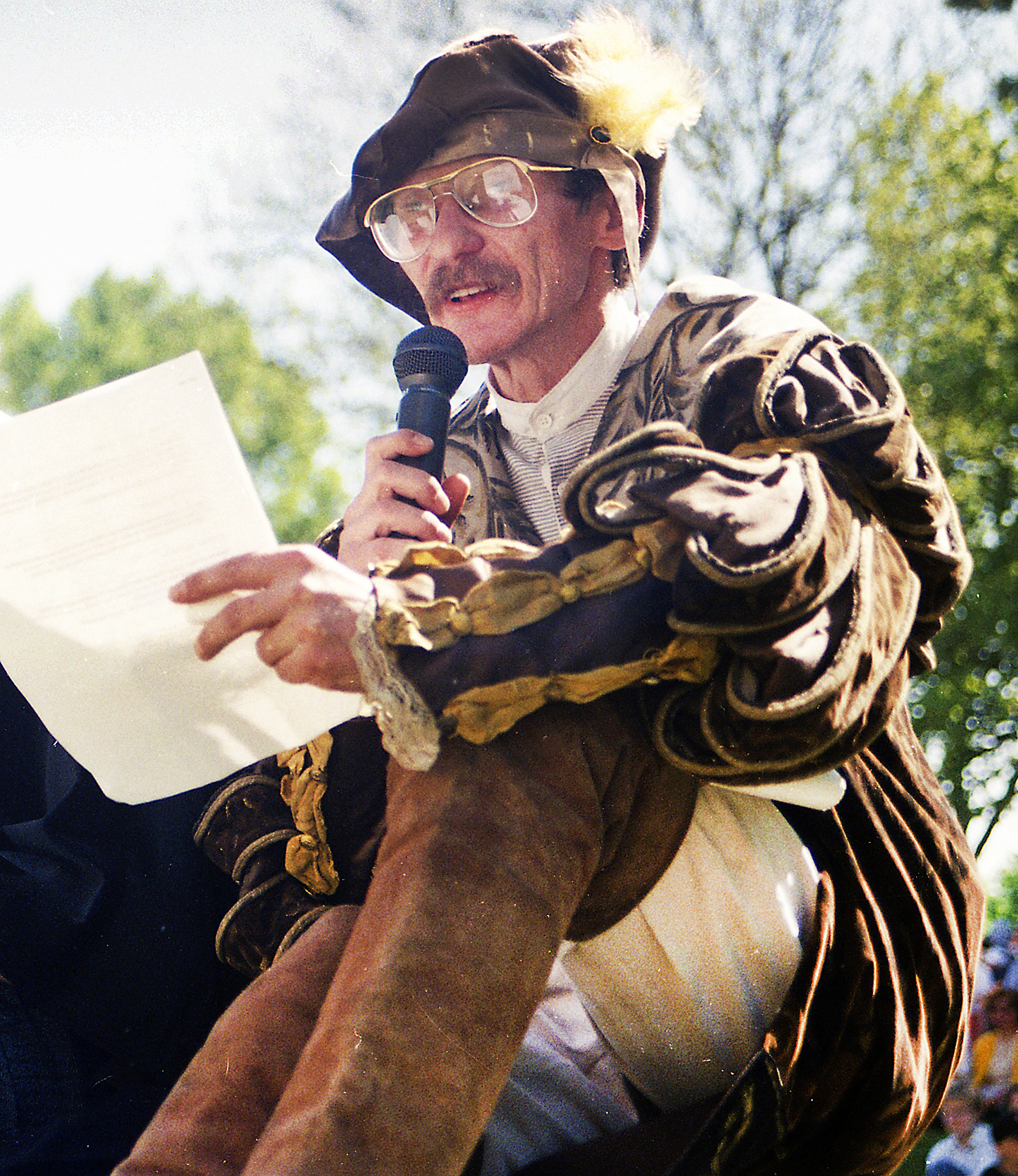
Ralf R. Parve in 1998

Ralf R. Parve (6 May 1946 Tallinn – 6 February 2008) was an Estonian humorist, radio personality and politician. He was a member of VII Riigikogu, representing the Estonian Centre Party.
