= Valjala Church =

Church building in Estonia

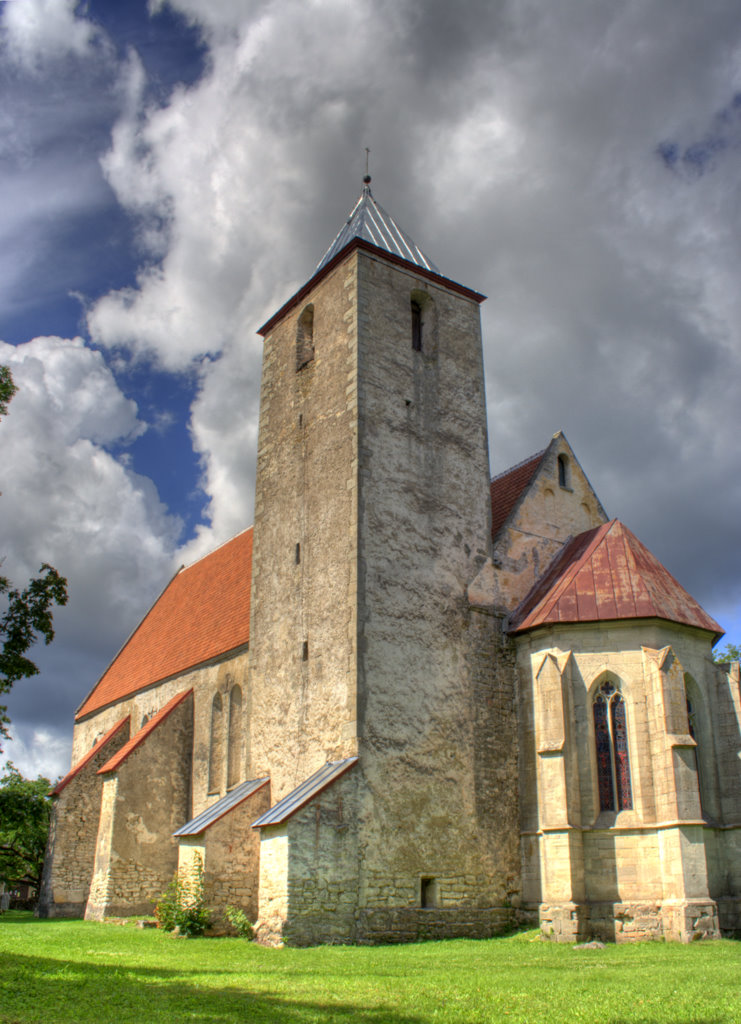

- Location in Estonia
- 58°24′29″N 22°47′20″E
- Country: Estonia
- Denomination: Lutheran

History
- Founded: 1227
- Founder: Livonian Order

Architecture
- Style: Romanesque; Gothic

Saint Martin's Church of Valjala is a Lutheran church in Valjala, on the island of Saaremaa, Estonia. It is the oldest stone church on Saaremaa and possibly the oldest surviving church in Estonia.

== History ==
=== 13th century ===
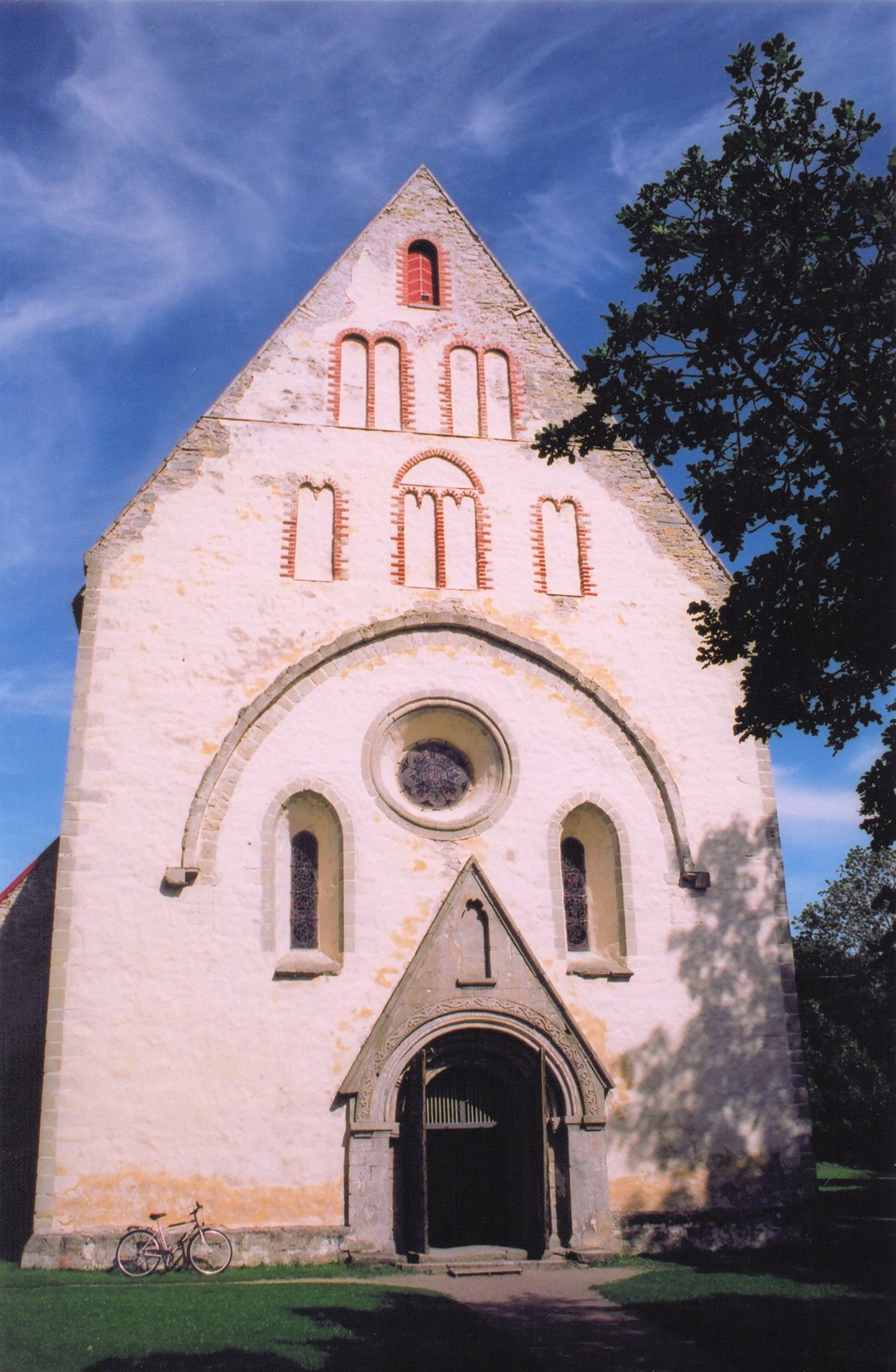
The west façade.

Christianity was brought to Estonia through the Northern Crusades, and construction of Valjala church started immediately following the Livonian Crusade, in 1227. The first church was a smaller chapel built near the site of the Valjala Stronghold. The chapel was later extended and still forms the nucleus of the current church. Remnants from this earliest period of the building include Romanesque fragments of murals depicting six of the apostles inside the church. In 1240, the church was expanded and it got its present form of a single-nave church. The builders stayed true to Romanesque forms as evidenced by the round-arched portals of the church.

=== 14th-17th centuries ===
In 1343 the church was damaged during the St. George's Night Uprising. Restoration works and other additions to the church henceforth were more clearly Gothic in form. For example, the windows, the vaults of the upper parts of the building, and the blind arch decoration on the west façade are typically pointed. The builders during this time possible came from Varnhem Abbey in Sweden. The church was clearly built to be able to function as a refuge in times of troubles, as well as a church. There are rooms above the vaults that are constructed so that they could only be reached using a ladder which could be pulled up. Also, an internal passageway just under the windows on the inside of the walls could be utilised to repel an advancing enemy.

During the later part of the 14th century, the church got a new polygonal apse. The tower, which was probably not completed until the 17th century, was probably also started during this period. Tombstone fragments of archaic, trapezoid form have been discovered in the walls of the tower, and it is believed that they may stem from pre-Christian times. They are rather unusual in that tombstones of this type have otherwise only been discovered in western Estonia.

=== 18th-20th centuries ===
The church was damaged during the Great Northern War. There are two Baroque carved epitaphs in the church, dating from 1664 (in memory of Andreas Fregius) and 1667 (in memory of Gaspar Berg).

In 1820, Nommen Lorenzen from Kuressaare, made the church's present altarpiece.

The church's organ is from 1888 and made by Gustav Normann.

The church was again damaged in 1922 when lightning struck the building.

The stained glass windows are made by artist Dolores Hoffmann and date from the 1970s.

=== 21st century ===
The organ was refurbished in 2004 by Ago Tint.

== Architecture ==
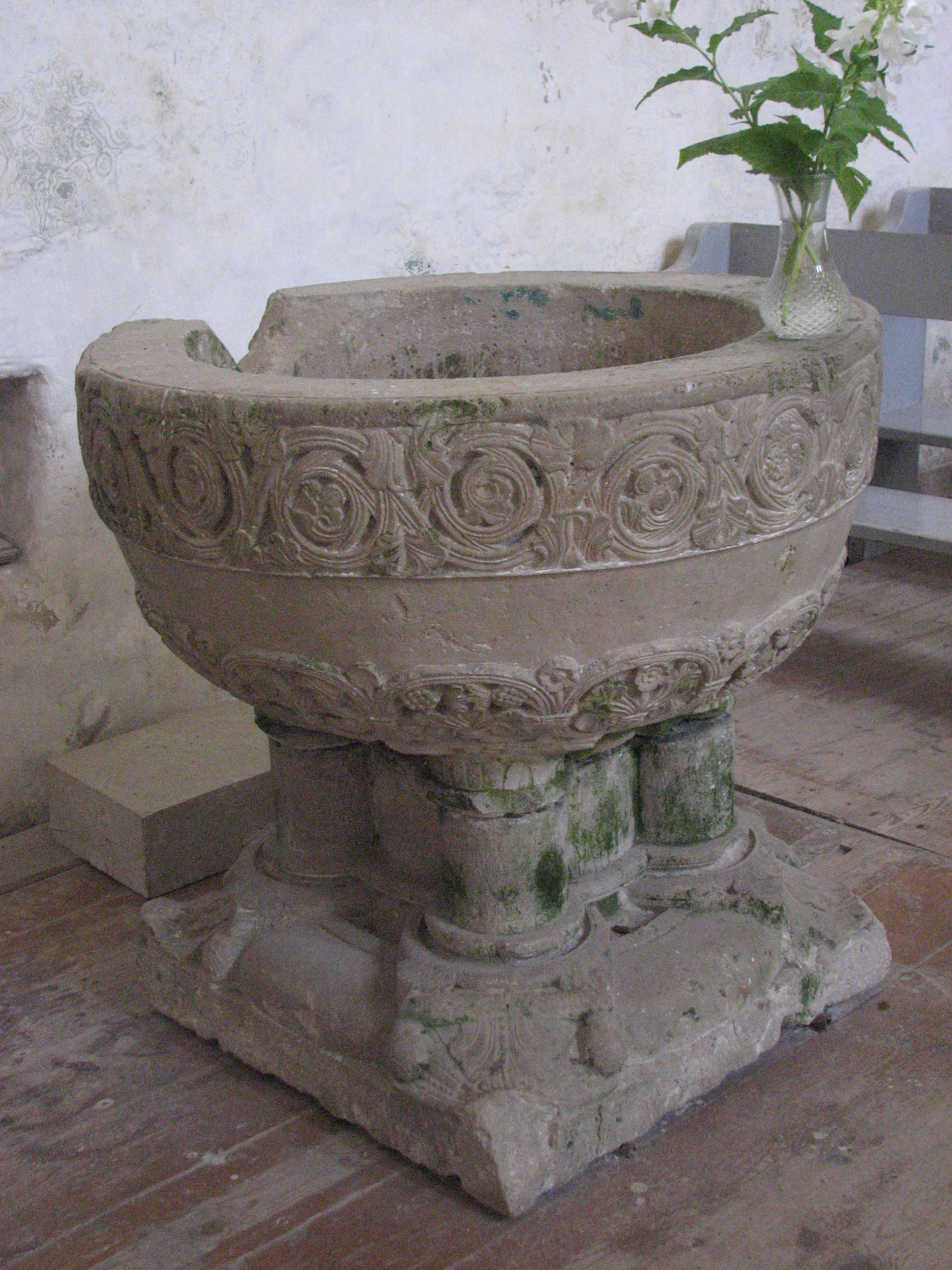
The baptismal font.

=== Exterior ===
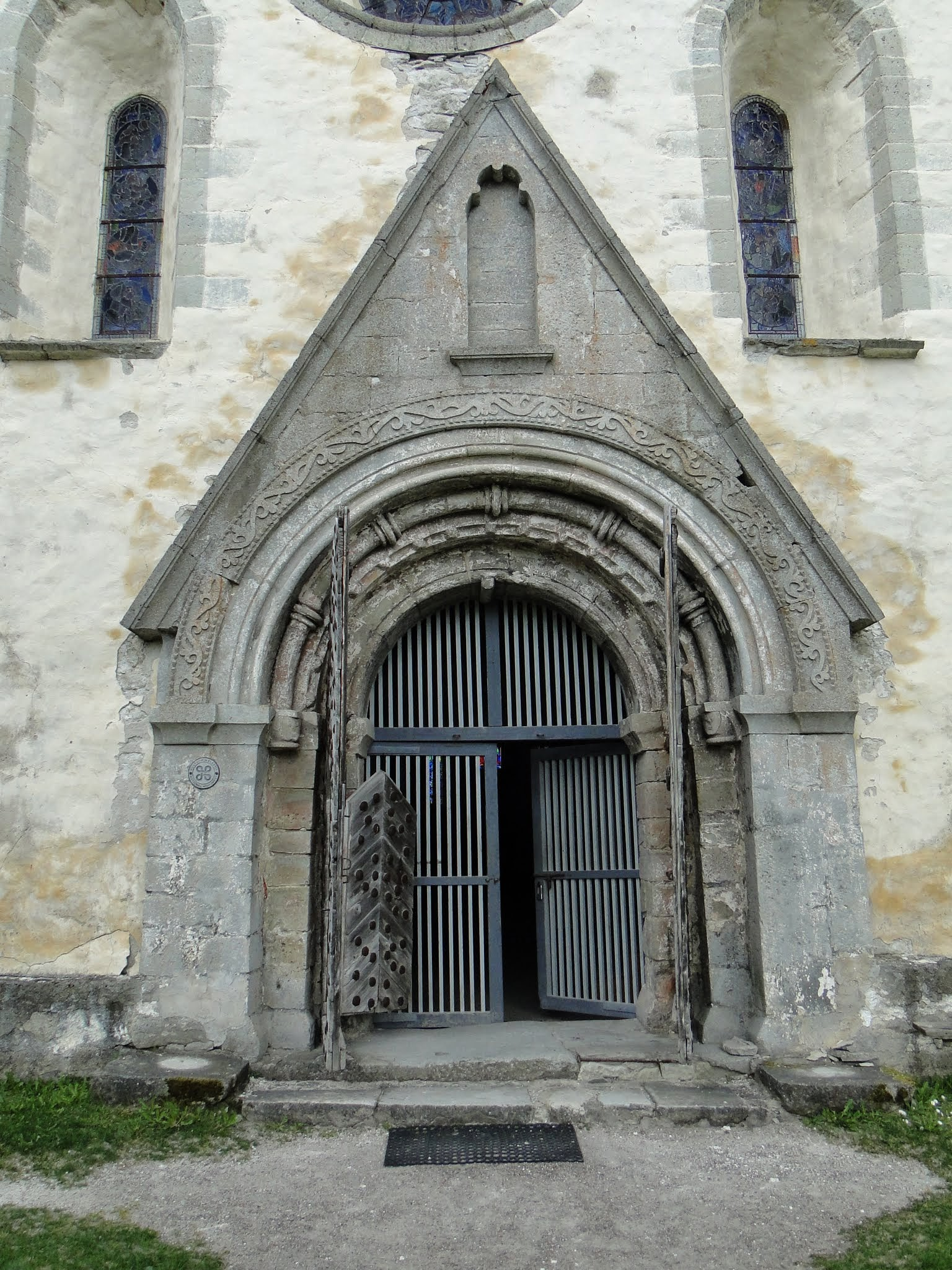
Main gate

The western facade of the church, decorated with blind arches and the finely sculpted, originally Romanesque portal is especially noteworthy and quite unique in Estonia. The church walls (1240–1270) are massive and the windows, coupled together, are narrow and tall. Contrasting with this is the apse, probably constructed after 1345, with its polygonal form and open character. Both the walls of the nave and the apse are supported by buttresses. The older parts of the exterior of the church are evidently the product of highly skilled Central European master builders, who probably also worked on constructing Kuressaare Castle, which dates from the same period.

The church tower is not original but probably built successively from the 14th to the 16th centuries.

=== Interior ===
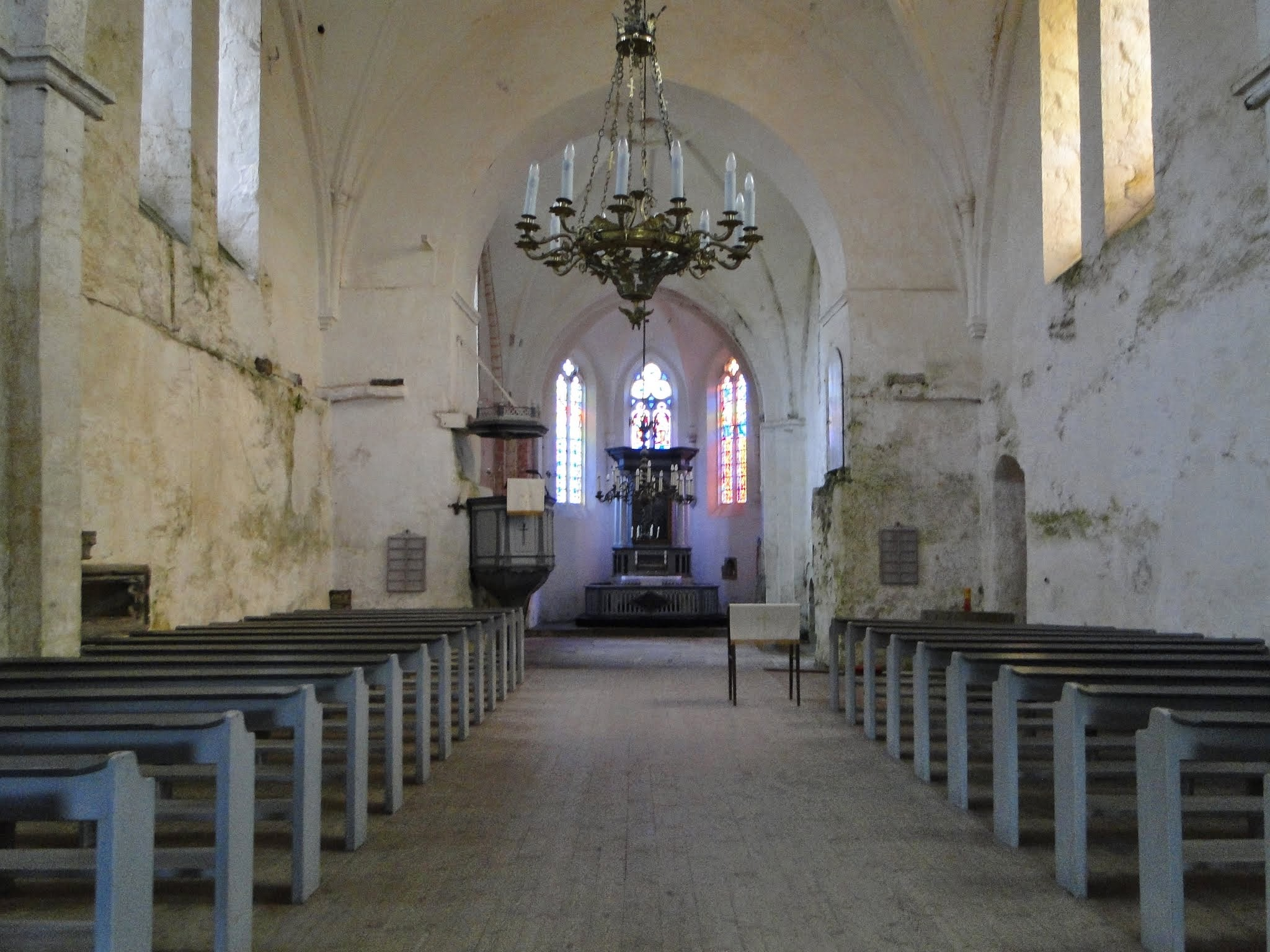
Interior view

The interior of the church is characterised by the whitewashed high domed vaults. The baptismal font is one of the most notable features of the church. It is one of the oldest pieces of carved stonework in Estonia. Scholars believe that it was made for Haapsalu Cathedral but somehow later found its way to Valjala. The font is richly decorated with expressive Romanesque sculptures, similar to those found in the northern portal of Riga Cathedral. It is believed that the artist both here and in Riga is the same, probably a Westphalian master carver.
