= Undimäe =

Village in Estonia

- Village
- Location in Estonia
- Coordinates: 58°24′38″N 22°48′58″E
- Country: Estonia
- County: Saare County
- Municipality: Saaremaa Parish

Population (2011 Census)
  - Total: 14

Undimäe is a village in Saaremaa Parish, Saare County, Estonia, located on the island of Saaremaa. As of the 2011 census, the settlement's population was 14.
