= Veeriku, Saare County =

Village in Estonia

Veeriku
- Village
- Location in Estonia
- Coordinates: 58°25′33″N 22°51′16″E
- Country: Estonia
- County: Saare County
- Municipality: Saaremaa Parish

Population (2011 Census)
  - Total: 41

Veeriku is a village in Saaremaa Parish, Saare County, Estonia, on the island of Saaremaa. As of the 2011 census, the settlement's population was 41.
