= Valjala =

Borough in Estonia

- small borough
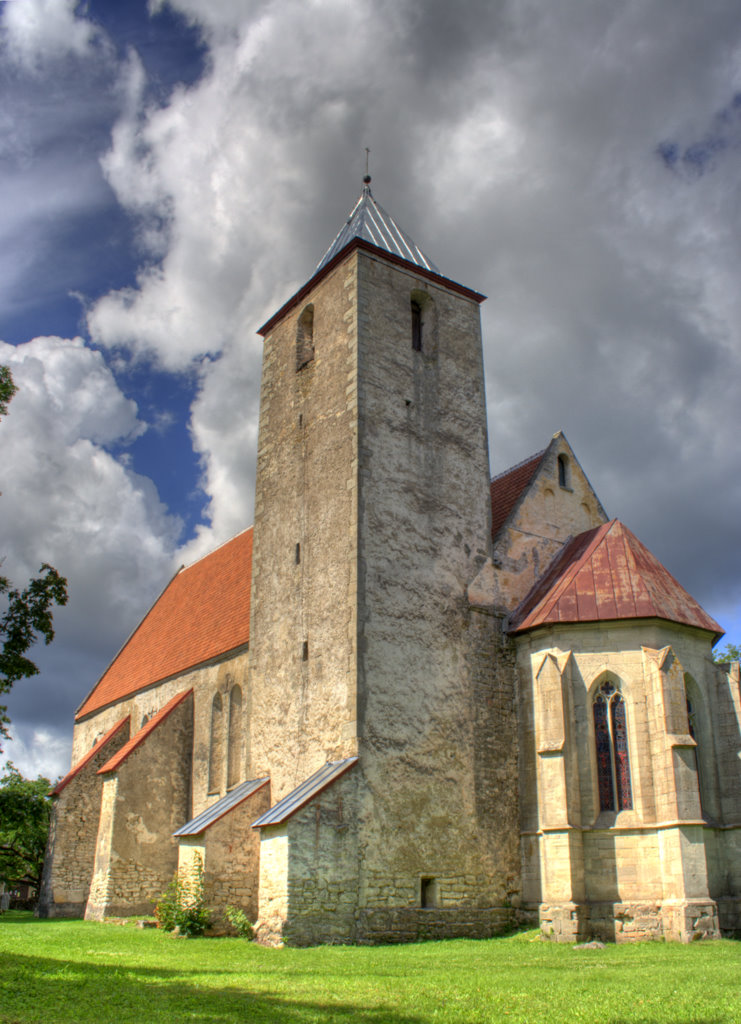
- St. Martin's Church in Valjala

- Location in Estonia
- Coordinates: 58°24′29″N 22°47′18″E
- Country: Estonia
- County: Saare County
- Municipality: Saaremaa Parish

Population (2011 Census)
  - Total: 410

Valjala (German: Wolde) is a small borough (Estonian: alevik) in Saaremaa Parish, Saare County in western Estonia. As of the 2011 census, the settlement's population was 410.

St. Martin's Church stands in the center of Valjala; it is the oldest stone church in Estonia. The ruins of Valjala Stronghold are about 700 meters (2,300 ft) south of Valjala.

Fresh excavations conducted in 2023 and 2024 uncovered a 12th-century dry stone wall protecting the inner settlement.
