= Lõupõllu =

Village in Estonia

Coordinates: 58°03′N 22°08′E

- Village
- Interactive map of Lõupõllu
- Country: Estonia
- County: Saare County
- Parish: Saaremaa Parish
- Time zone: UTC+2 (EET)
  - Summer (DST): UTC+3 (EEST)

Lõupõllu is a village in Saaremaa Parish, Saare County in western Estonia.
