= Lööne =

Village in Estonia

- Village
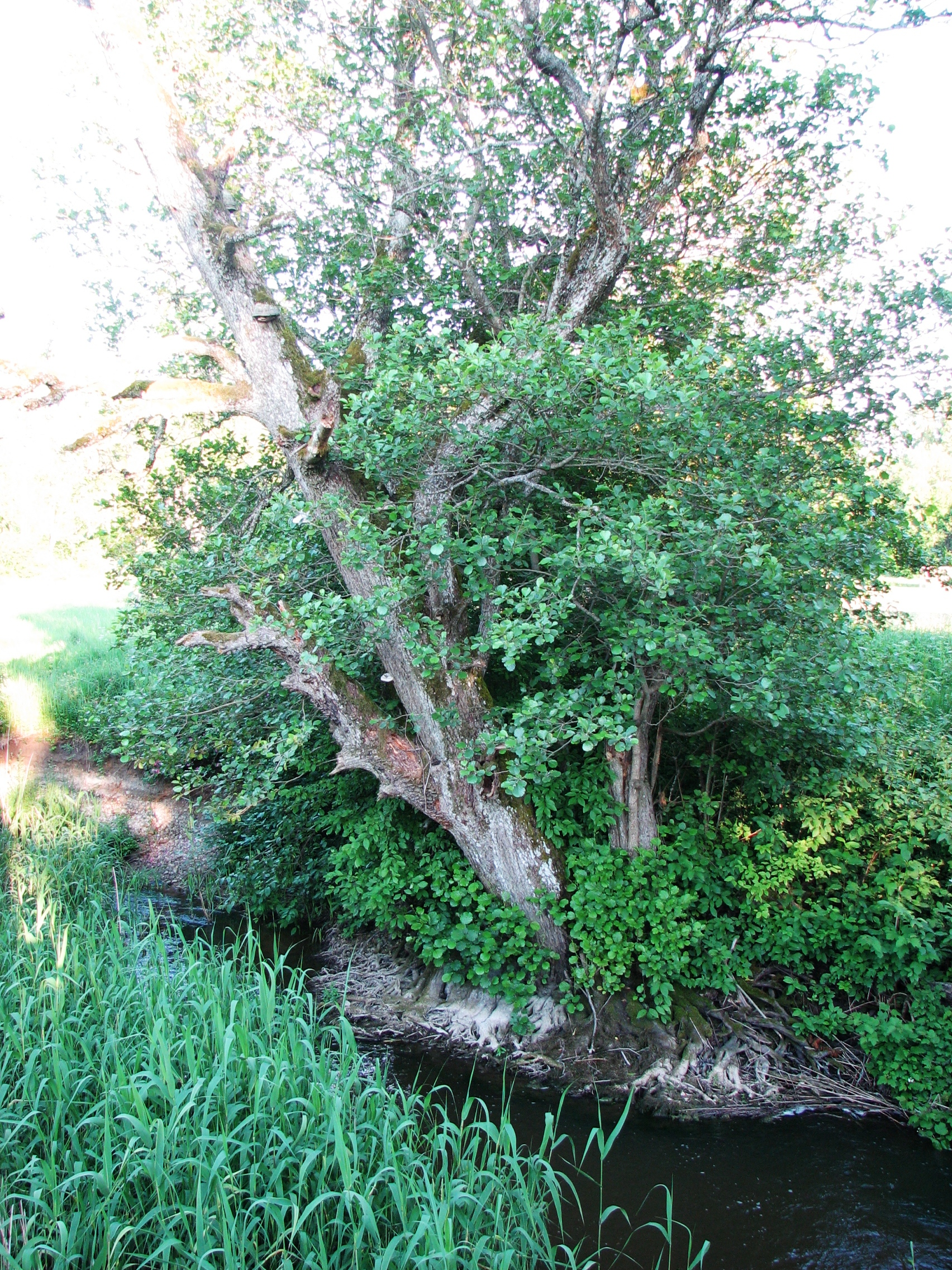
- A tree on the bank of the river Lõve near the village of Löone

- Location in Estonia
- Coordinates: 58°25′14″N 22°44′41″E
- Country: Estonia
- County: Saare County
- Municipality: Saaremaa Parish

Population (2011 Census)
  - Total: 28

Lööne is a village in Saaremaa Parish, Saare County, Estonia, on the island of Saaremaa. As of the 2011 census, the settlement's population was 28.

Lööne Manor is located in the village.
