= Tammuna =

Village in Estonia

Coordinates: 57°57′N 22°01′E

- Village
- Interactive map of Tammuna
- Country: Estonia
- County: Saare County
- Parish: Saaremaa Parish
- Time zone: UTC+2 (EET)
  - Summer (DST): UTC+3 (EEST)

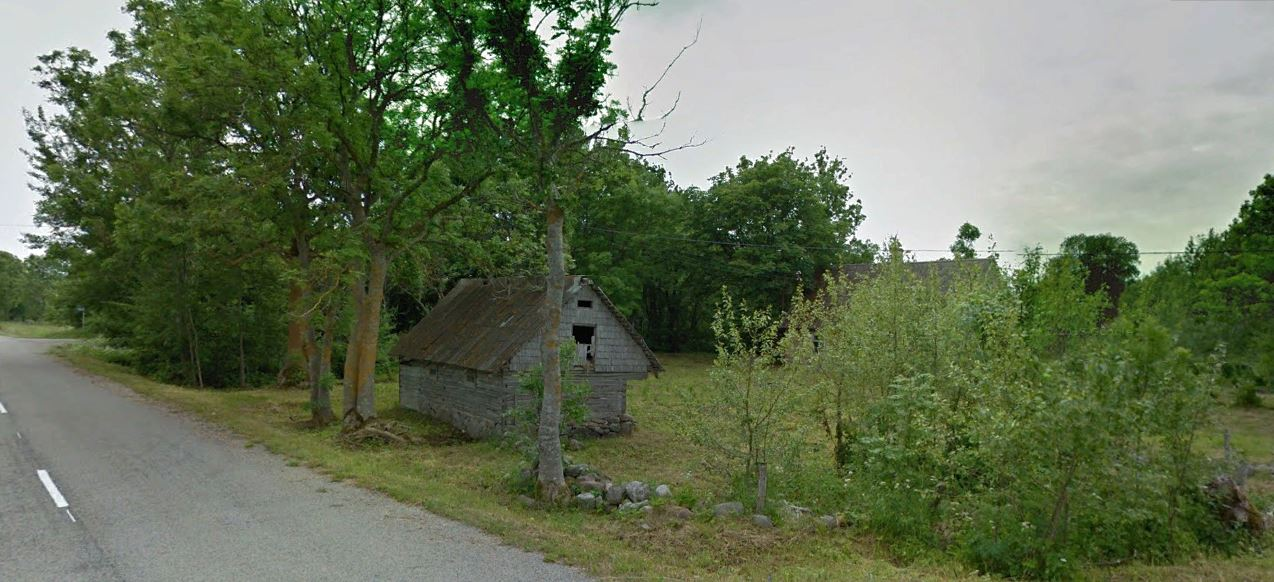
Tammuna

Tammuna is a village in Saaremaa Parish, Saare County in western Estonia.
