= Kellämäe =

Village in Estonia

- Location within Estonia
- Coordinates: 57°38′5″N 26°53′16″E
- Country: Estonia
- County: Võru County
- Time zone: UTC+2 (EET)

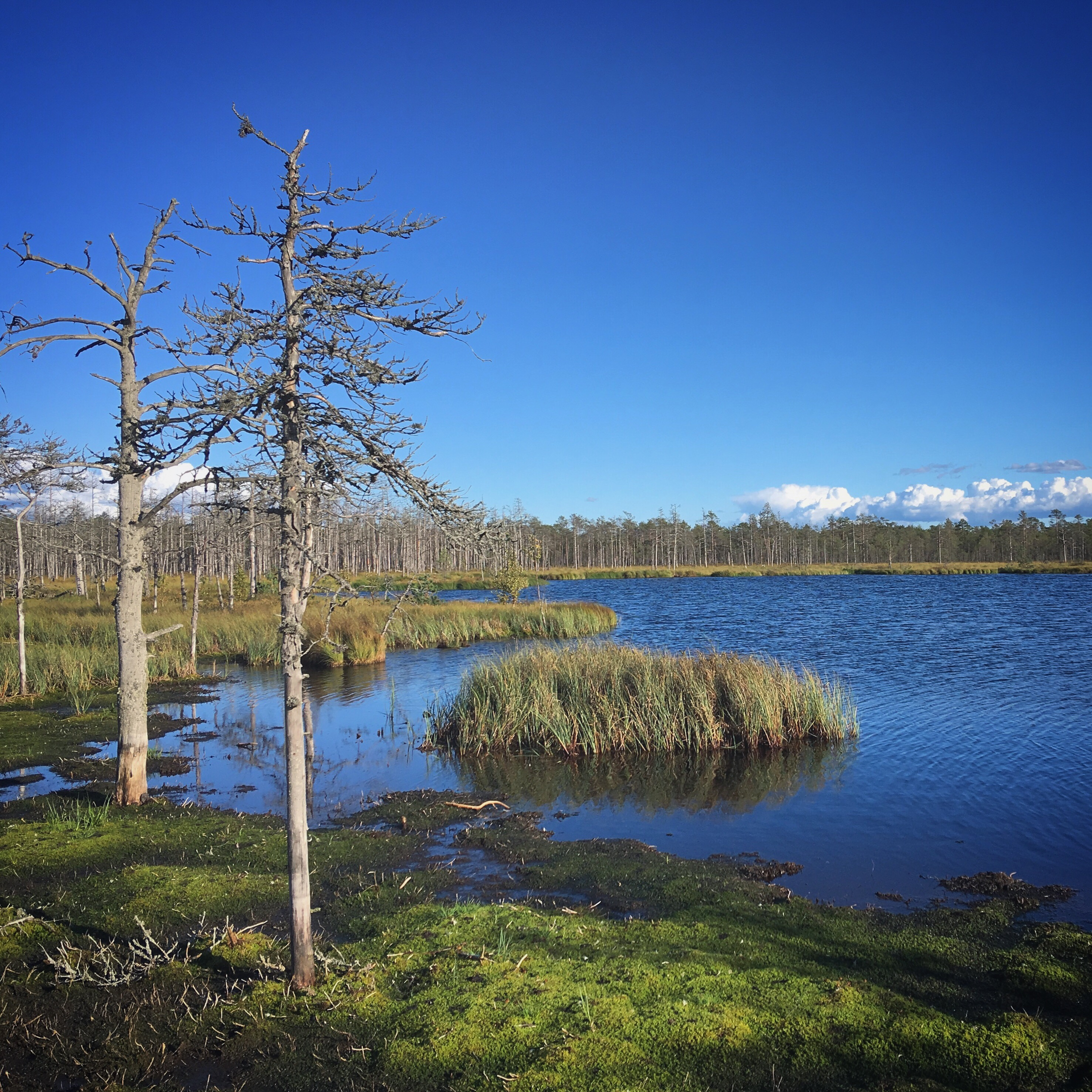

Kellämäe is a settlement in Rõuge Parish, Võru County in southeastern Estonia.
