= Karuste =

Village in Estonia

Coordinates: 57°56′N 22°01′E

- Village
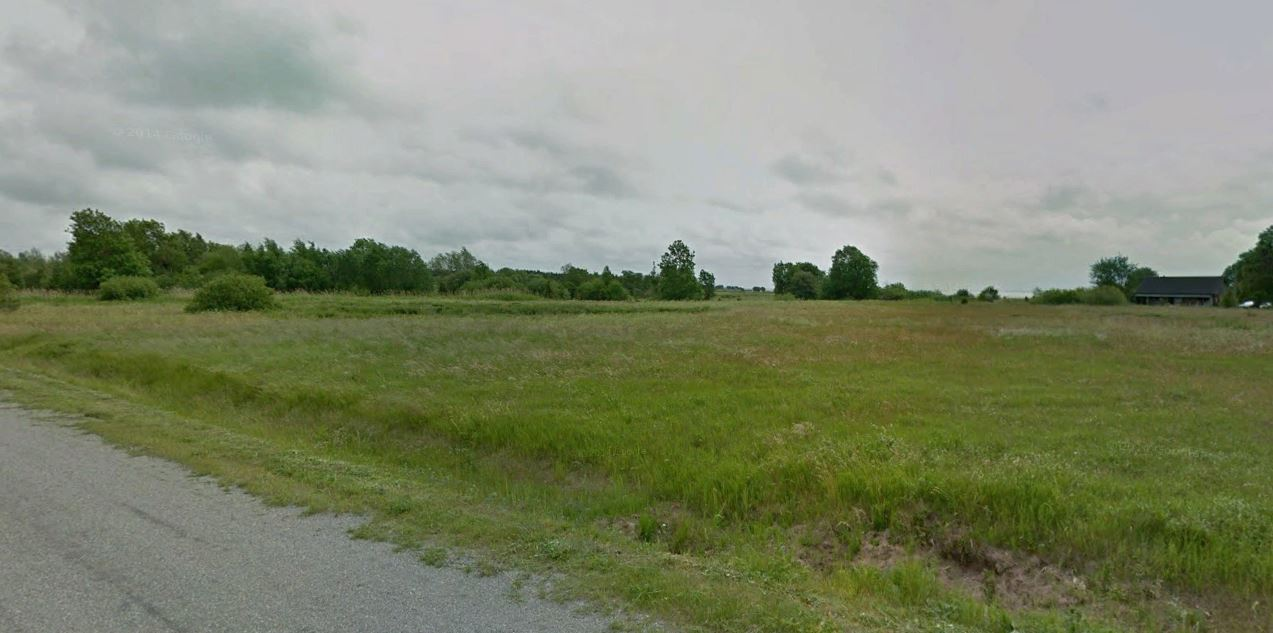
- Interactive map of Karuste
- Country: Estonia
- County: Saare County
- Parish: Saaremaa Parish
- Time zone: UTC+2 (EET)
  - Summer (DST): UTC+3 (EEST)

Karuste is a village in Saaremaa Parish, Saare County in western Estonia.
