= Vilidu =

Village in Estonia

- Village
- Location in Estonia
- Coordinates: 58°26′03″N 22°49′02″E
- Country: Estonia
- County: Saare County
- Municipality: Saaremaa Parish

Population (2011 Census)
  - Total: 9

Vilidu is a village in Saaremaa Parish, Saare County, Estonia, on the island of Saaremaa. As of the 2011 census, the settlement's population was 9.
