= Läbara =

Village in Estonia

Coordinates: 57°56′N 22°06′E

- Village
- Interactive map of Läbara
- Country: Estonia
- County: Saare County
- Parish: Saaremaa Parish
- Time zone: UTC+2 (EET)
  - Summer (DST): UTC+3 (EEST)

Läbara is a village in Saaremaa Parish, Saare County in western Estonia. It is sometimes named Lebara or Lebara-on-Zerel in English sources.
