= Väljaküla, Saaremaa Parish =

Village in Estonia

Väljaküla
- Village
- Location in Estonia
- Coordinates: 58°20′53″N 22°51′46″E
- Country: Estonia
- County: Saare County
- Municipality: Saaremaa Parish

Population (2011 Census)
  - Total: 23

Väljaküla is a village in Saaremaa Parish, Saare County, Estonia, on the island of Saaremaa. As of the 2011 census, the settlement's population was 23.
