= Mõisaküla, Lääne County =

Village in Estonia

Coordinates: 59°01′00″N 23°43′03″E

Mõisaküla
- Village
- Interactive map of Mõisaküla
- Country: Estonia
- County: Lääne County
- Parish: Lääne-Nigula Parish
- Time zone: UTC+2 (EET)
  - Summer (DST): UTC+3 (EEST)

Mõisaküla is a village in Lääne-Nigula Parish, Lääne County, in western Estonia.
