= Maantee =

Village in Estonia

Coordinates: 57°56′N 22°06′E

- Village
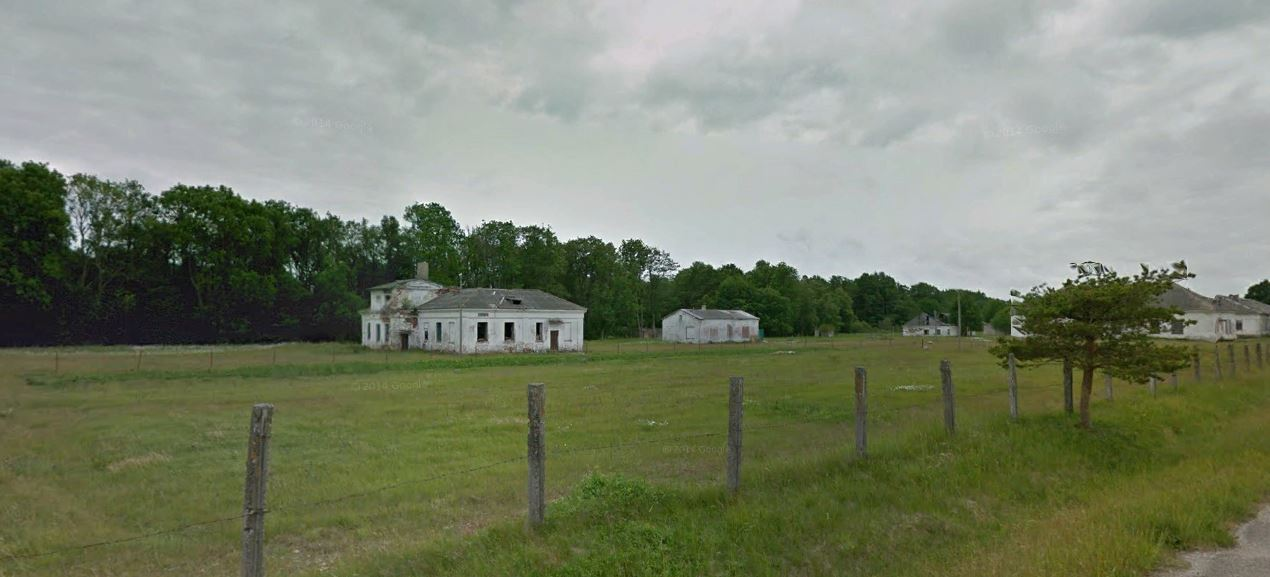
- Interactive map of Maantee
- Country: Estonia
- County: Saare County
- Parish: Saaremaa Parish
- Time zone: UTC+2 (EET)
  - Summer (DST): UTC+3 (EEST)

Maantee is a village in Saaremaa Parish, Saare County in western Estonia.

== Name ==
Maantee was attested in written sources as Mahndi Pawel in 1731 and Mante in 1798. It is believed that the name of the village comes from the common noun maantee 'highway, country road' because it is located along a road. For similar names, compare German Landstraß (literally 'highway, country road', now Kostanjevica na Krki, Slovenia) and various settlements in Slovenia named Cesta (literally, 'road'). Places with this name in Slovenia lie along roads that predated Slavic settlement in the area.
