= Kaunispe =

Village in Estonia

Coordinates: 58°02′N 22°05′E

- Village
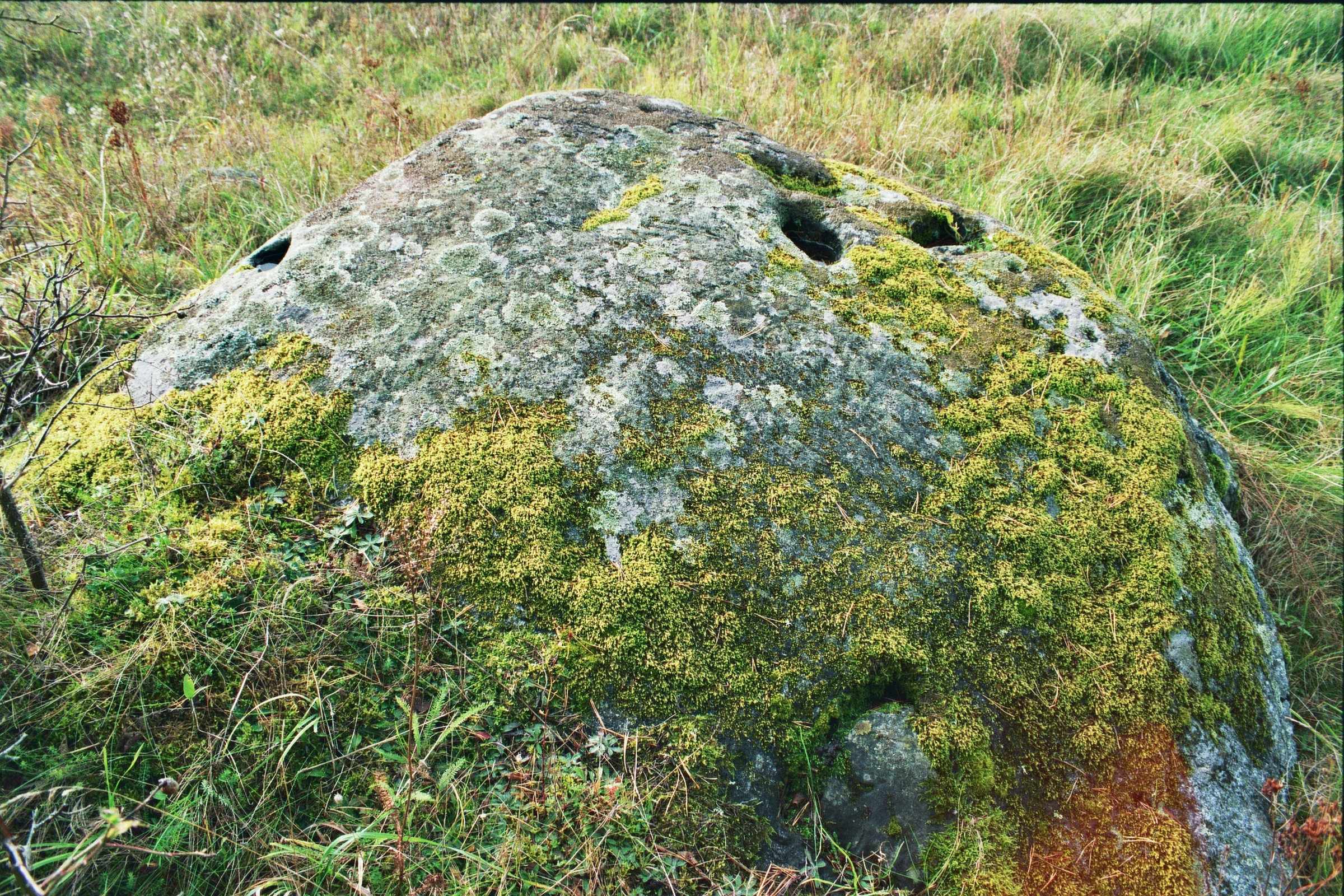
- Interactive map of Kaunispe
- Country: Estonia
- County: Saare
- Parish: Saaremaa
- Time zone: UTC+2 (EET)
  - Summer (DST): UTC+3 (EEST)

Kaunispe is a village in Saaremaa Parish, Saare County in western Estonia.
