= Laadla, Saare County =

Village in Estonia

Laadla
- village
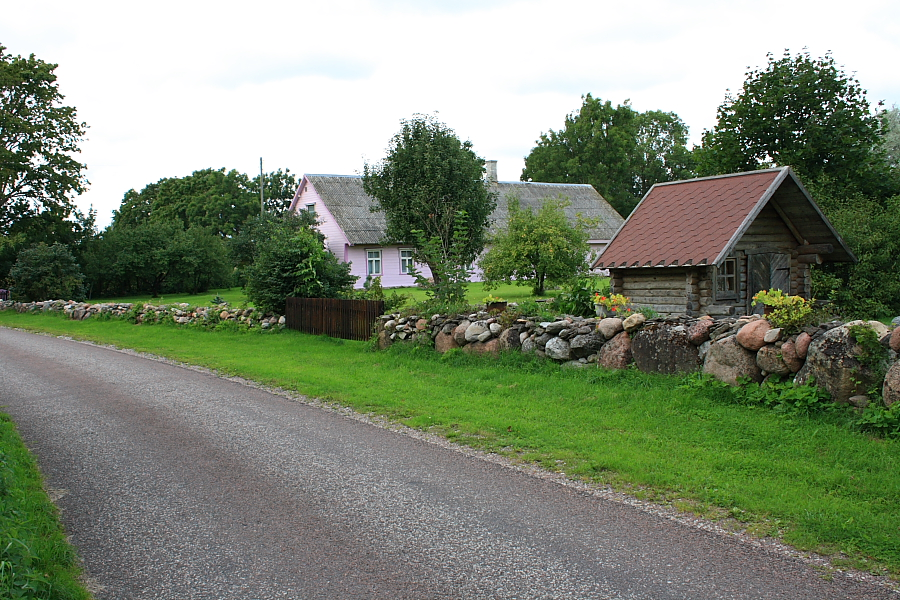

- Location in Estonia
- Coordinates: 57°58′30″N 22°02′27″E
- Country: Estonia
- County: Saare County
- Municipality: Saaremaa Parish

Population (01.01.2008)
  - Total: 34

Laadla is a village in Saaremaa Parish, Saare County, Estonia, on the island of Saaremaa. It has a population of 34 (as of 1 January 2008).
