= Lindmetsa =

Village in Estonia

Coordinates: 58°02′50″N 22°05′09″E

- Village
- Interactive map of Lindmetsa
- Country: Estonia
- County: Saare County
- Parish: Saaremaa Parish
- Time zone: UTC+2 (EET)
  - Summer (DST): UTC+3 (EEST)

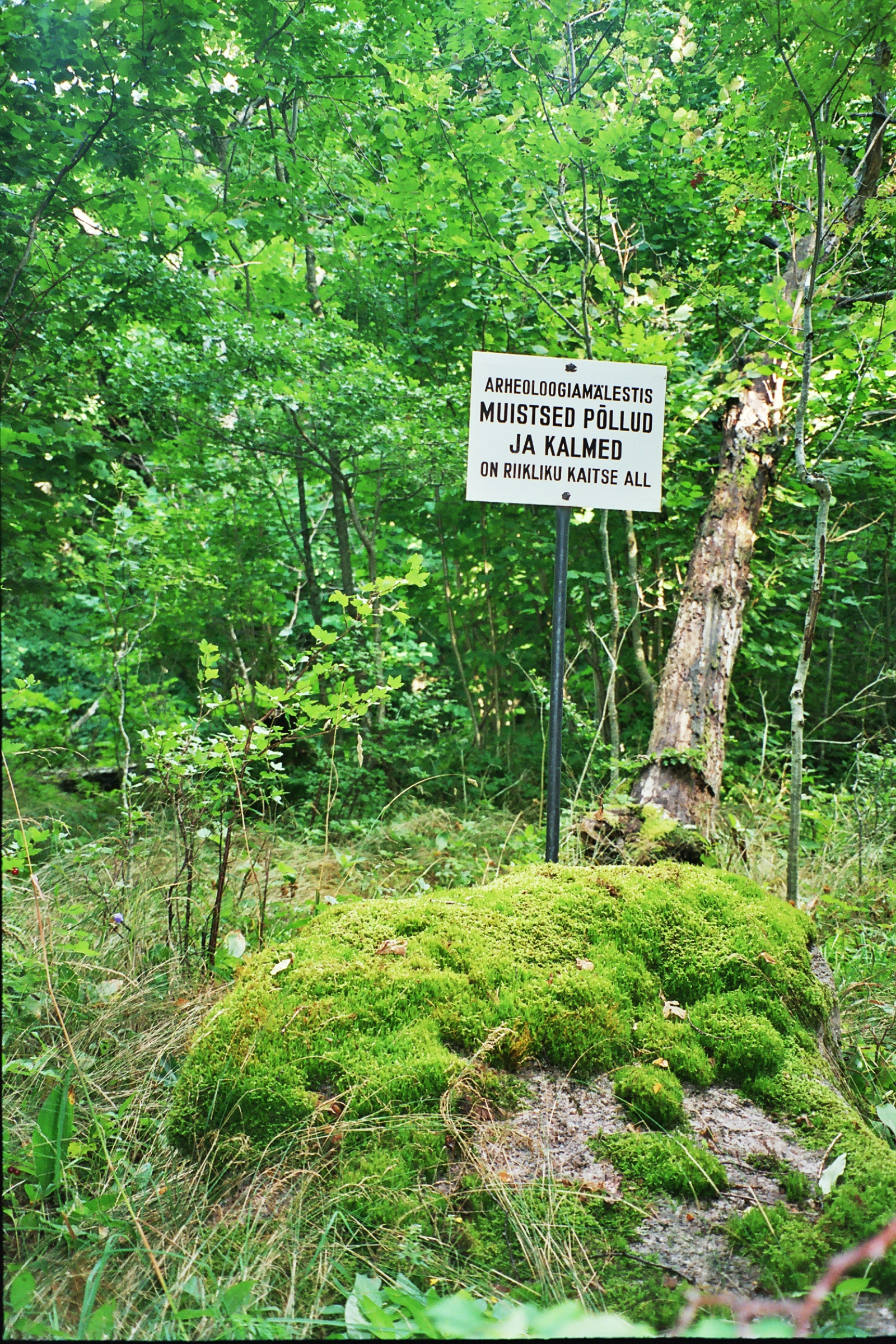
Archaeological site near Lindmetsa

Lindmetsa is a village in Saaremaa Parish, Saare County in western Estonia.
