= Iide, Estonia =

Village in Estonia

Iide
- Village
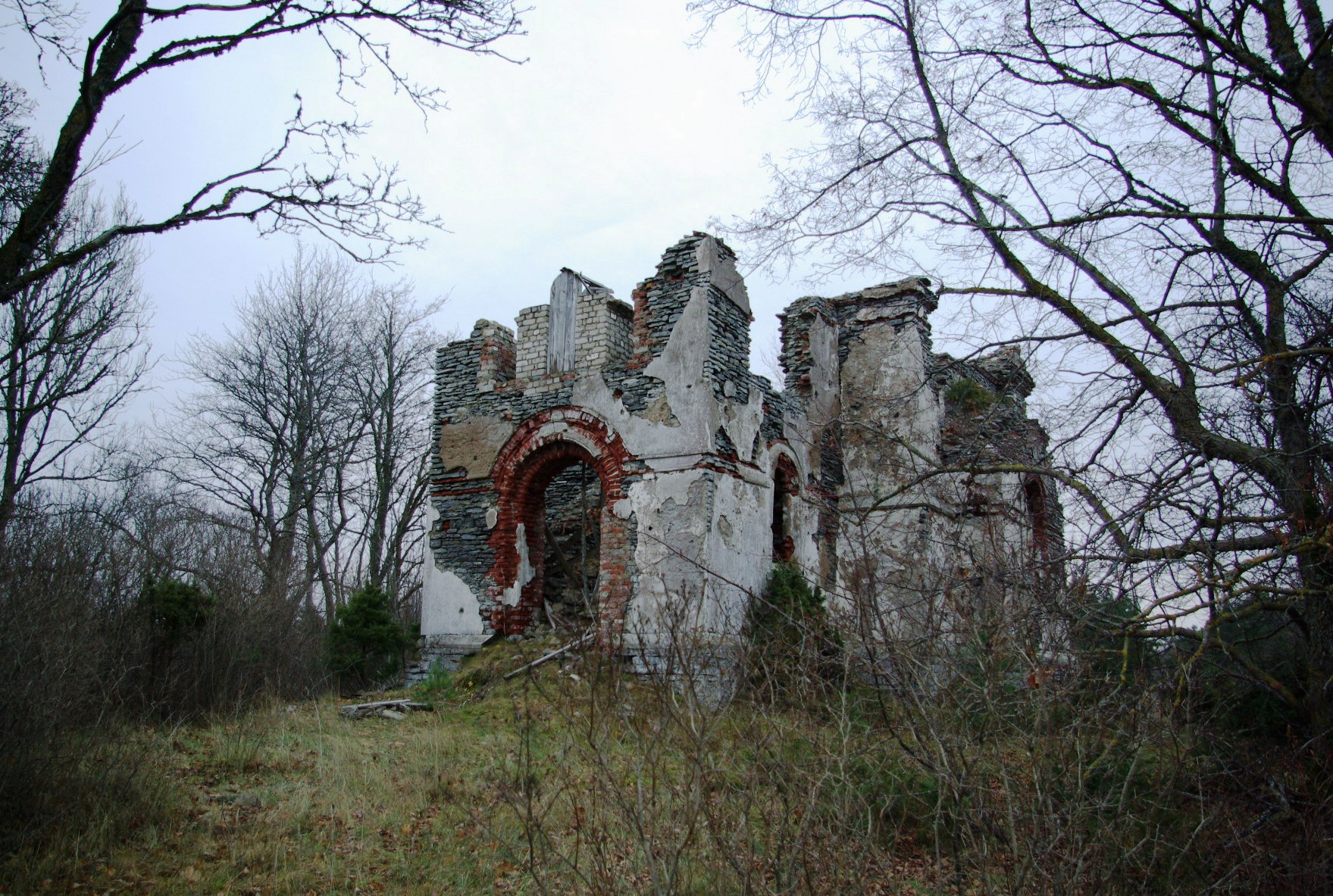
- Ruins of the Church of John the Apostle in Iide

- Location in Estonia
- Coordinates: 57°58′34″N 22°03′55″E
- Country: Estonia
- County: Saare County
- Municipality: Saaremaa Parish

Population (01.01.2008)
  - Total: 67

Iide is a village in Saaremaa Municipality, Saare County, Estonia, located on the Sõrve peninsula on the island of Saaremaa. Prior to the 2017 administrative reforms of Estonian municipalities, it was the administrative centre of Torgu Parish. Iide has a population of 67 (as of 1 January 2008).
