= Soodevahe, Saare County =

Village in Estonia

Coordinates: 57°58′51″N 22°05′58″E

Soodevahe
- Village
- Interactive map of Soodevahe
- Country: Estonia
- County: Saare County
- Parish: Saaremaa Parish
- Time zone: UTC+2 (EET)
  - Summer (DST): UTC+3 (EEST)

Soodevahe is a village in Saaremaa Parish, Saare County in western Estonia.
