= Mõisaküla, Saaremaa Parish =

Village in Estonia

Mõisaküla
- Village
- Location within Estonia
- Coordinates: 58°17′14″N 22°01′30″E
- Country: Estonia
- County: Saare County
- Parish: Saaremaa Parish
- Time zone: UTC+2 (EET)
  - Summer (DST): UTC+3 (EEST)

Mõisaküla is a village in Saaremaa Parish, Saare County, on the western part of Saaremaa Island, Estonia.

Before the administrative reform in 2017, the village was in Lääne-Saare Parish.
