= Torgu-Mõisaküla =

Village in Estonia

Coordinates: 57°59′34″N 22°04′24″E

- Village
- Interactive map of Torgu-Mõisaküla
- Country: Estonia
- County: Saare County
- Parish: Saaremaa Parish
- Time zone: UTC+2 (EET)
  - Summer (DST): UTC+3 (EEST)

Torgu-Mõisaküla (Mõisaküla until 2017) is a village in Saaremaa Parish, Saare County in western Estonia.
