= Kungla, Saaremaa Parish =

Village in Estonia

Kungla
- Village
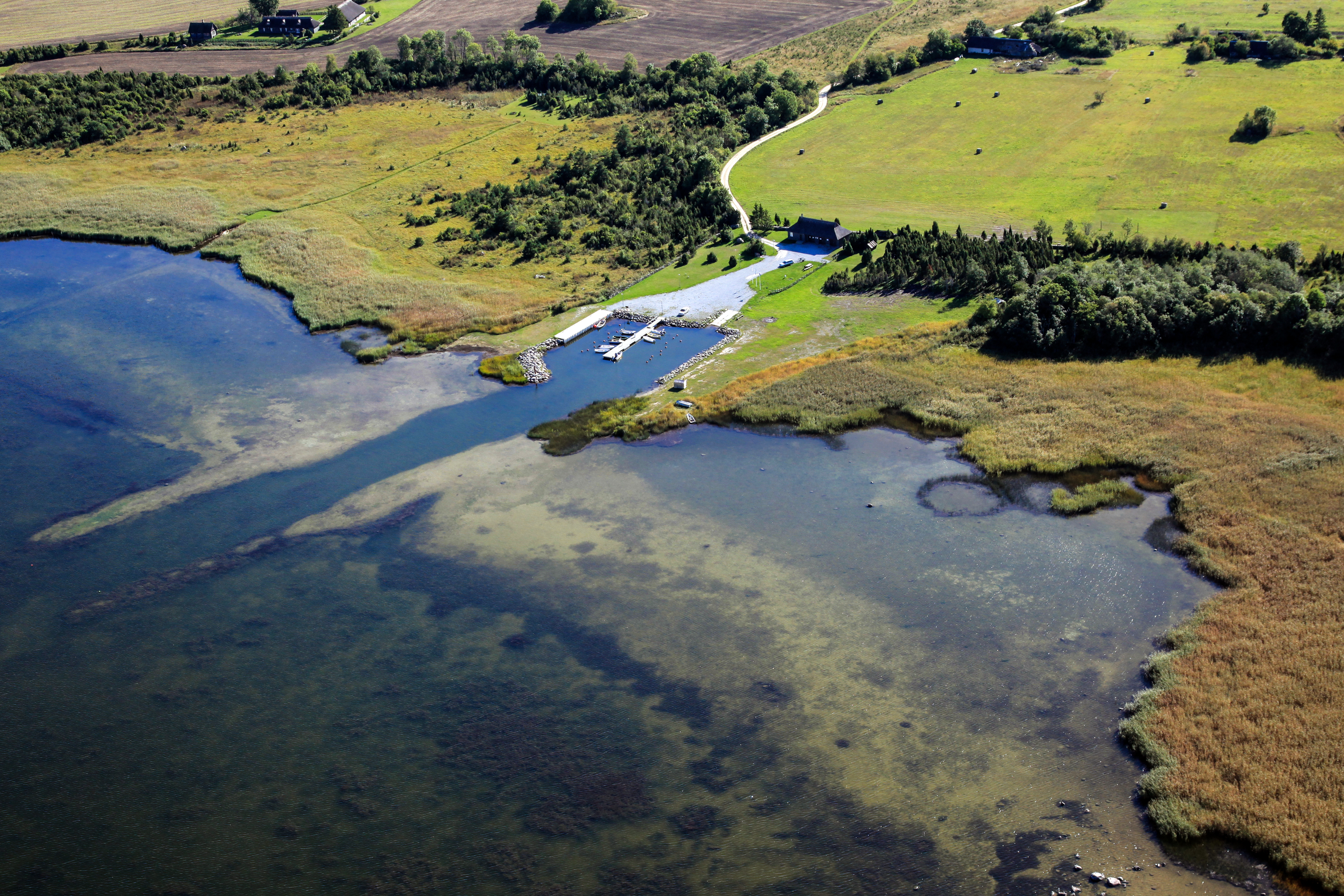
- Kungla harbour

- Location in Estonia
- Coordinates: 58°21′31″N 22°56′59″E
- Country: Estonia
- County: Saare County
- Municipality: Saaremaa Parish

Population (2011 Census)
  - Total: 39

Kungla is a village in Saaremaa Parish, Saare County, Estonia. it is located on the southern coast of Saaremaa island by the Gulf of Riga. As of the 2011 census, the village's population was 39.

In 2011, the first public harbour in Saaremaa Parish was opened in Kungla village.
