= Tõnija =

Village in Estonia

- Village
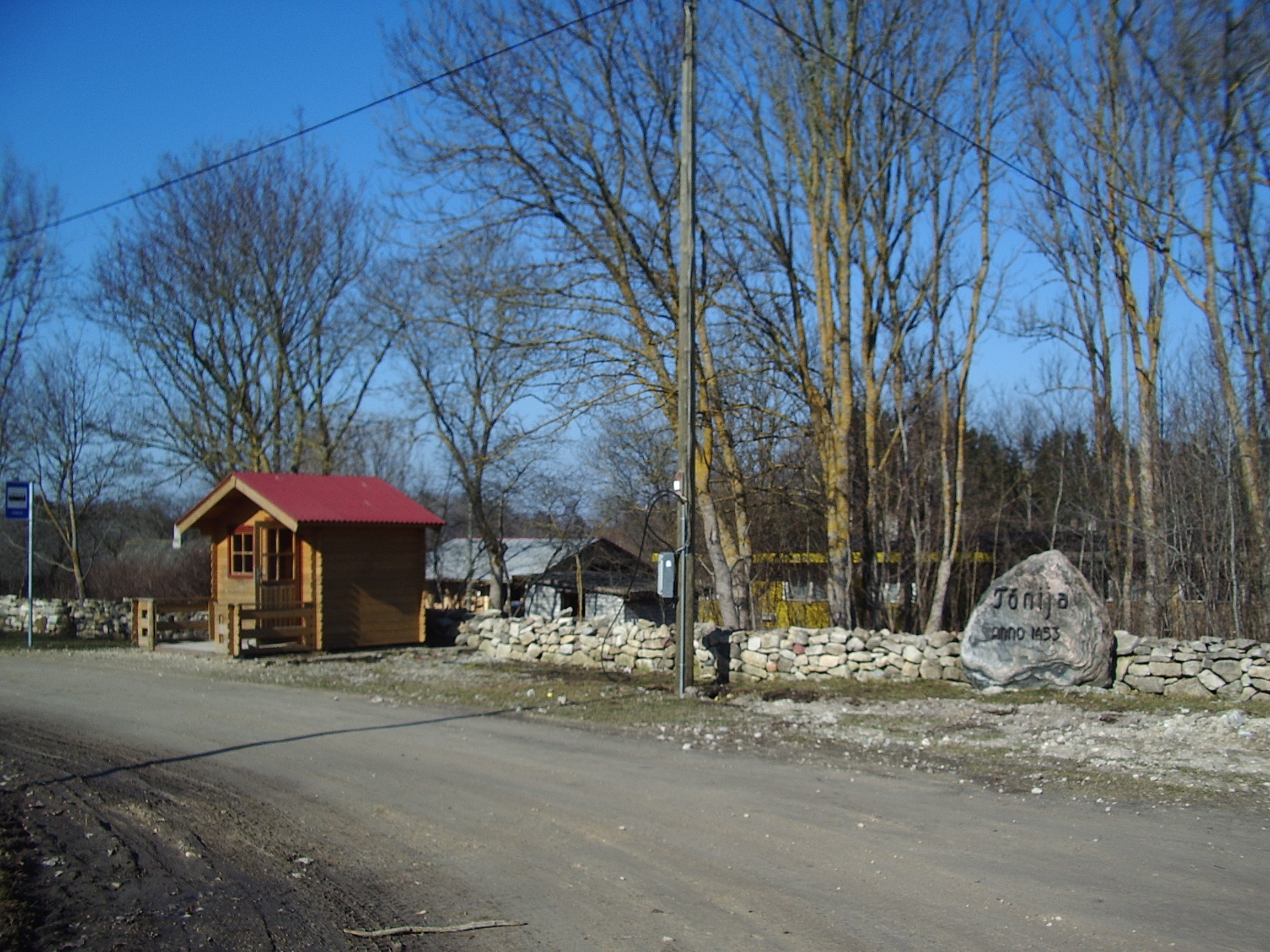

- Location in Estonia
- Coordinates: 58°24′42″N 22°54′18″E
- Country: Estonia
- County: Saare County
- Municipality: Saaremaa Parish
- First mentioned: 1453

Population (2011 Census)
  - Total: 43

Tõnija is a village in Saaremaa Parish, Saare County, Estonia, on the island of Saaremaa. As of the 2011 census, the settlement's population was 43.

Tõnija village was first mentioned in 1453 as Toneyegell.

== Gallery ==
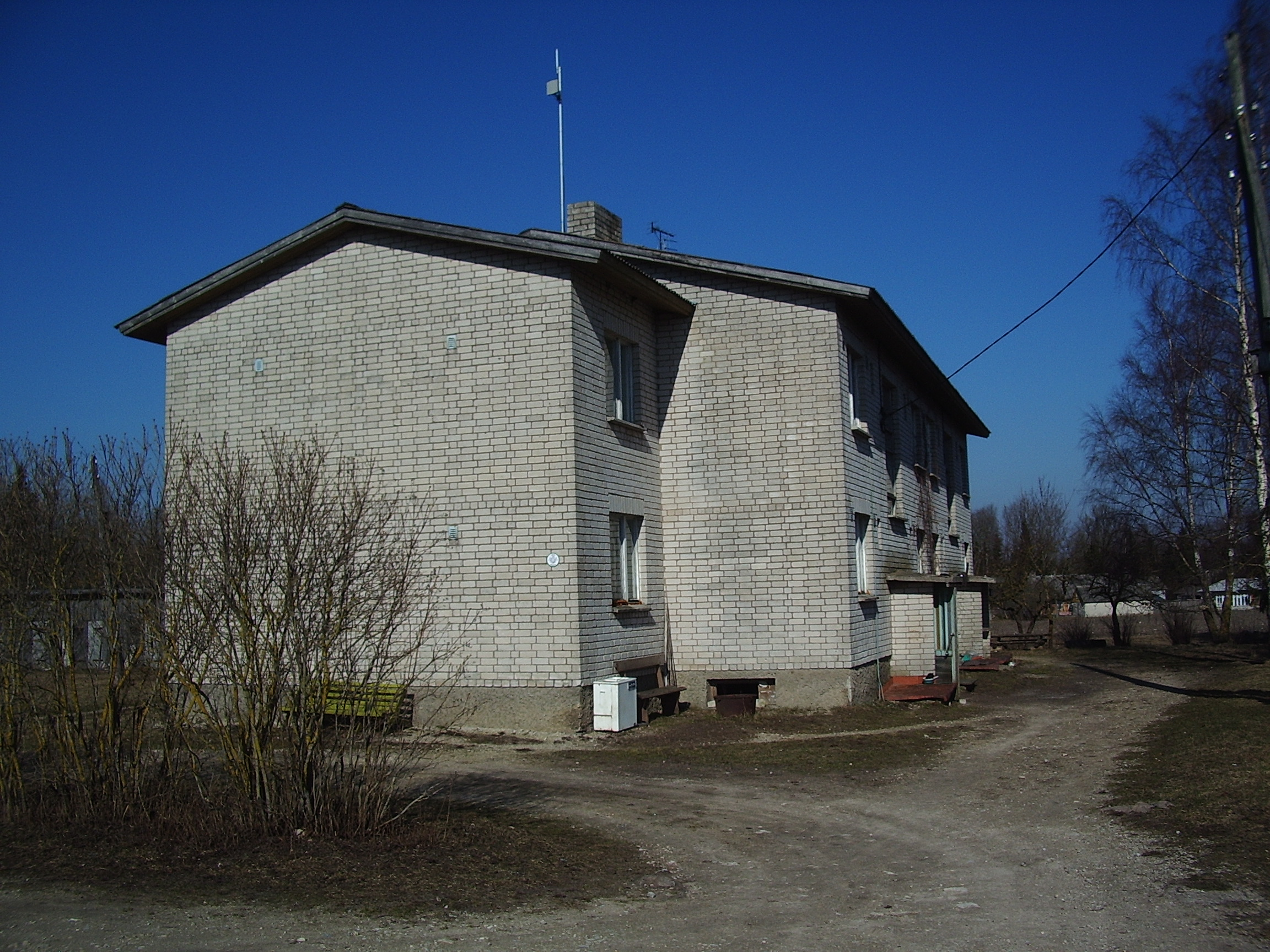
The only apartment building in the village

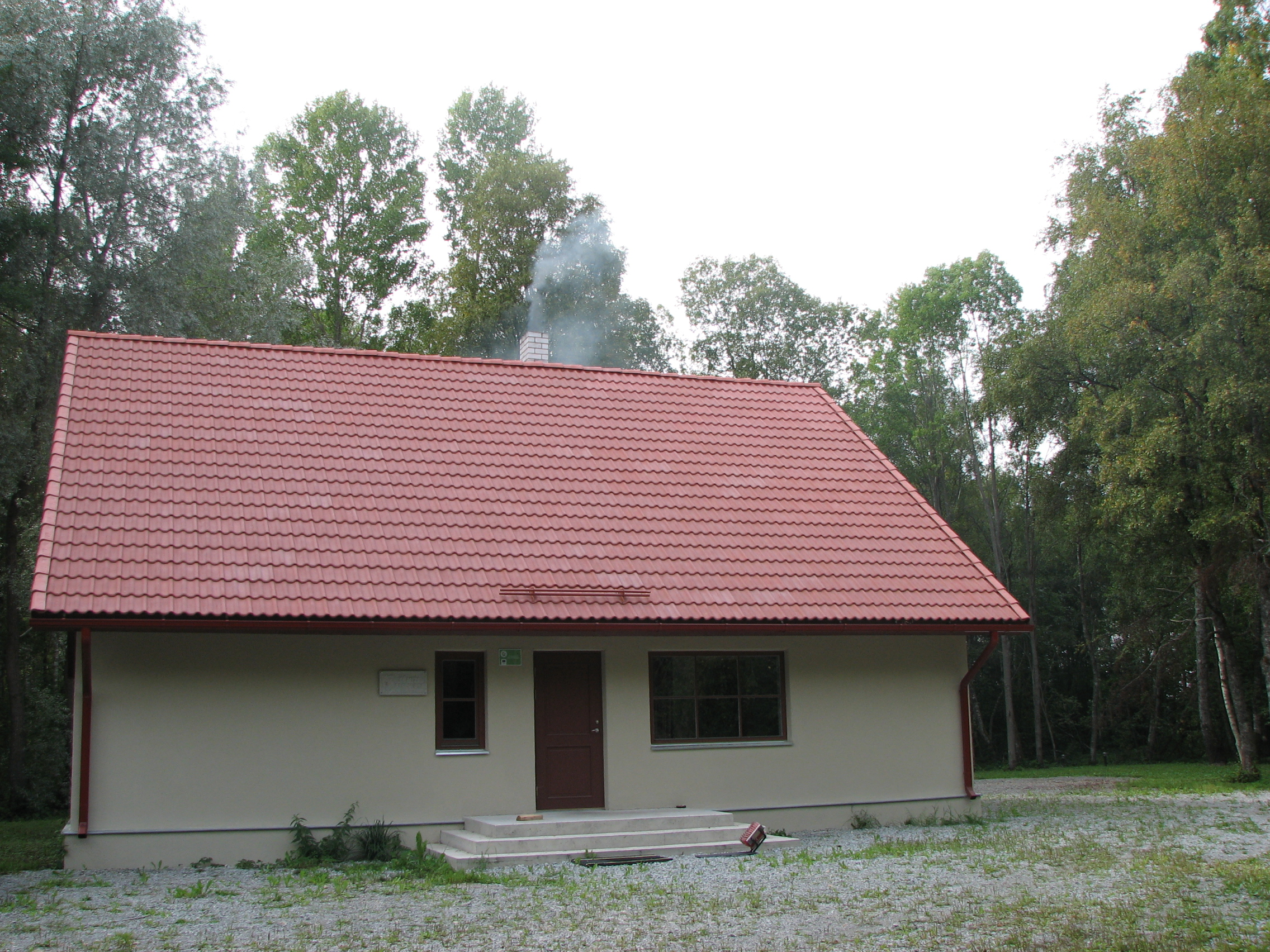
Tõnija hunting lodge
