= Kallemäe =

Village in Estonia

- Village
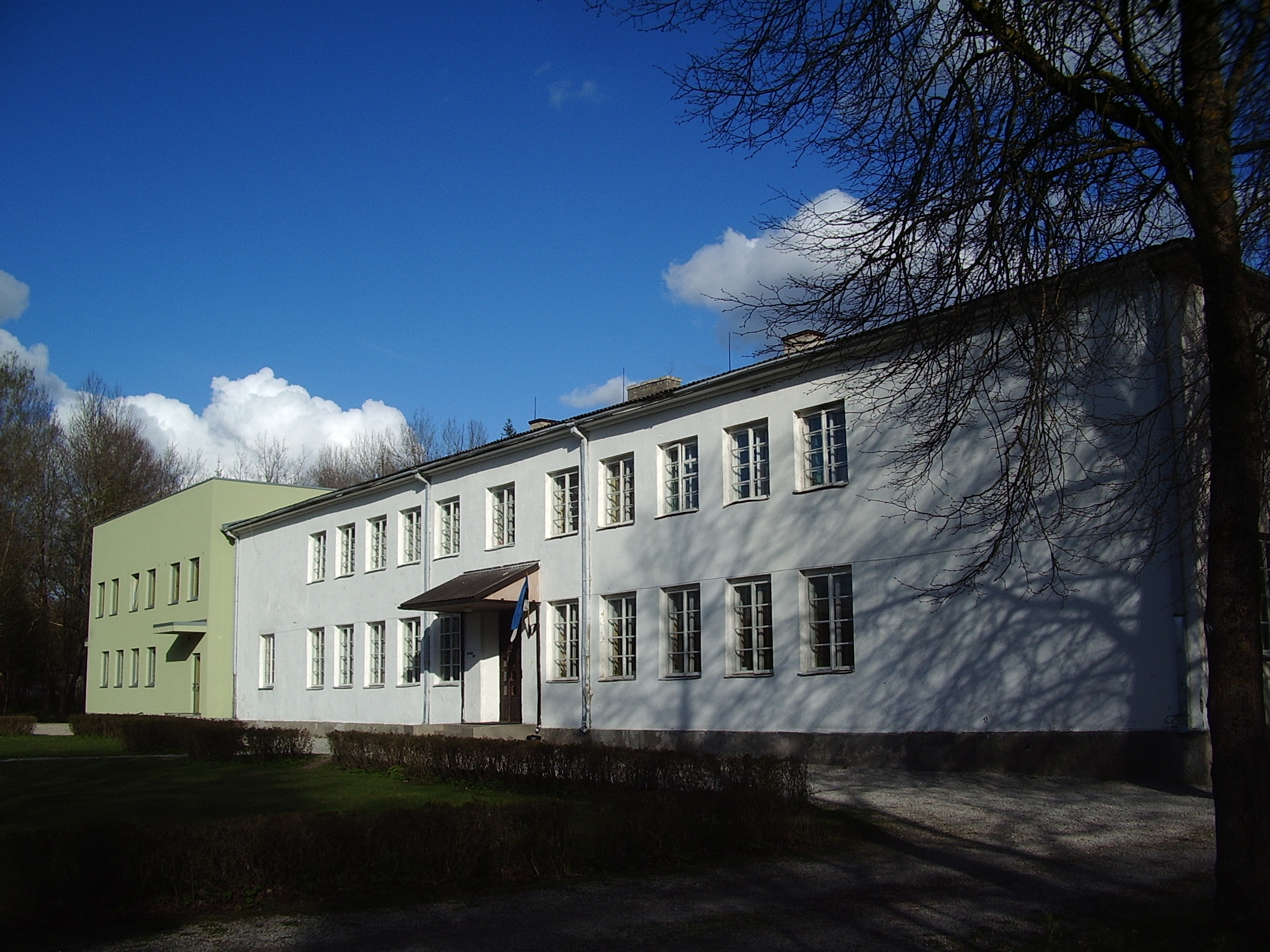
- Kallemäe School

- Location in Estonia
- Coordinates: 58°22′15″N 22°52′53″E
- Country: Estonia
- County: Saare County
- Municipality: Saaremaa Parish

Population (2011 Census)
  - Total: 39

Kallemäe is a village in Saaremaa Parish, Saare County, Estonia, on the island of Saaremaa. As of the 2011 census, the settlement's population was 39.

Kallemäe is home to a special school for children with lite mental disabilities. There's also a local shop in the village. A post office was closed there in November 2007.

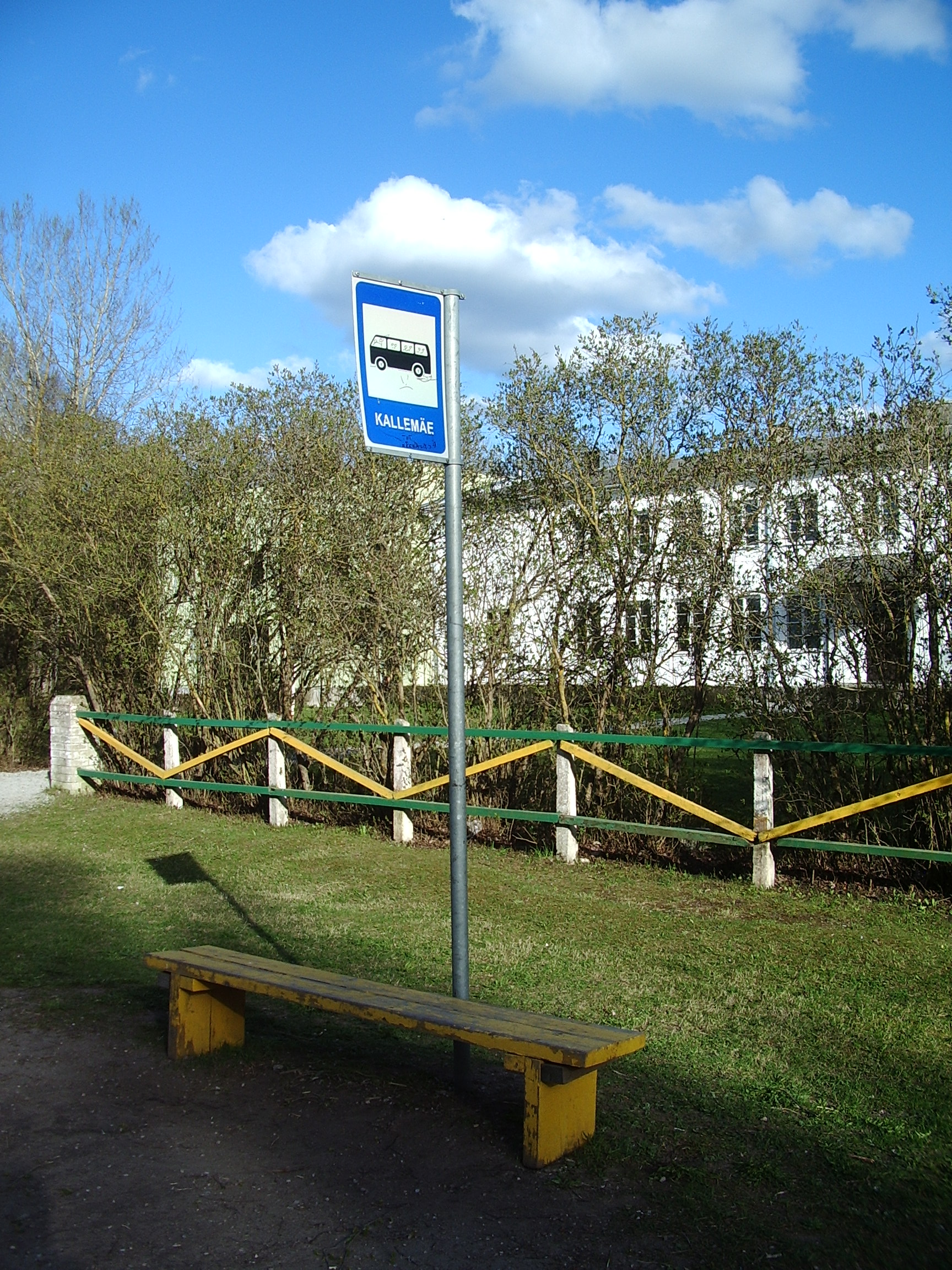
Kallemäe bus stop in front of school
