= Kaarma Parish =

Municipality of Estonia (1999–2014)

Coordinates: 58°20′N 22°29′E

Kaarma Parish Kaarma vald
- Former municipality of Estonia
- Flag Coat of arms

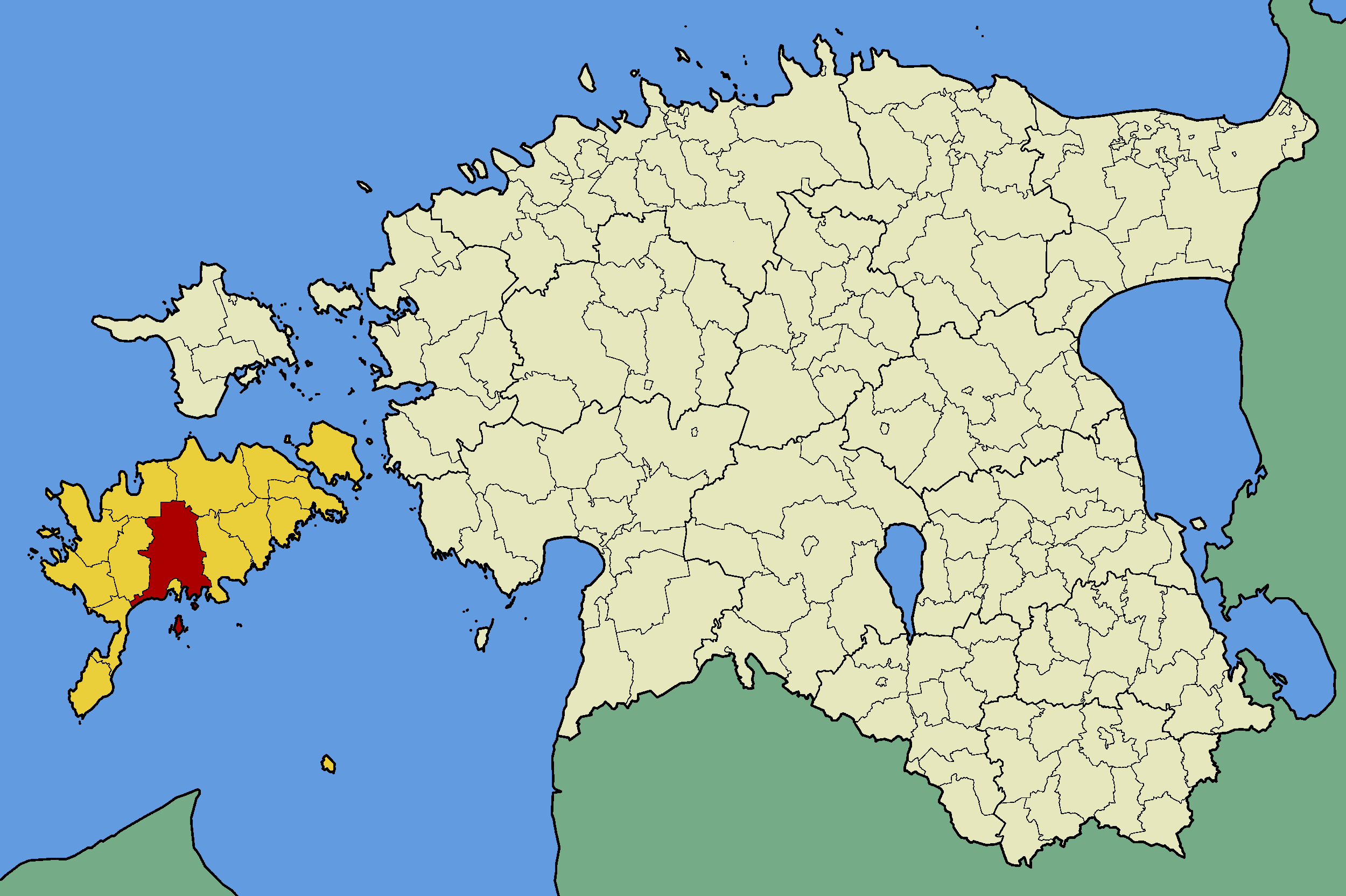
- Kaarma Parish within Saare County.
- Country: Estonia
- County: Saare County
- Administrative centre: Kuressaare

Area
  - Total: 400 km^{2} (150 sq mi)

Population (01.01.2012)
  - Total: 4,608
  - Density: 12/km^{2} (30/sq mi)
- Website: www.kaarma.ee

Kaarma Parish was a municipality of Saare County, Estonia next to Kuressaare. In 2014, it was merged with the municipalities of Kärla and Lümanda to become the Lääne-Saare municipality.

The municipality had a population of 4,608 (as of 1 January 2012) and covered an area of 400 km^{2}. It had 87 km of land border and 98 km of waterline.

Islands in Kaarma Parish: Abruka, Kasselaid, Linnusitamaa, Vahase, Väike-Tulpe.

== Settlements ==
Kaarma Parish contains 70 settlements: 3 small boroughs and 67 villages.

Small boroughs

Aste - Kudjape - Nasva

Villages

Abruka - Anijala - Ansi - Aste - Asuküla - Aula-Vintri - Eikla - Endla - Haamse - Hakjala - Hübja - Irase - Jootme - Jõe - Kaarma - Kaarmise - Kaisvere - Kasti - Kaubi - Kellamäe - Keskranna - Keskvere - Kiratsi - Kirikuküla - Koidu - Koidula - Kuke - Kungla - Käku - Kärdu - Laadjala - Laheküla - Laoküla - Lilbi - Maleva - Meedla - Metsaküla - Mullutu - Muratsi - Mändjala - Mõisaküla - Nõmme - Paimala - Parila - Piila - Praakli - Pähkla - Pärni - Põlluküla - Randvere - Saia - Sepa - Sikassaare - Tahula - Tamsalu - Tõlli - Tõrise - Tõru - Uduvere - Unimäe - Upa - Vaivere - Vantri - Vatsküla - Vestla - Viira - Õha

== International relations ==
=== Twin towns — Sister cities ===
- Väike-Maarja Parish, Estonia

== See also ==
- Municipalities of Estonia
- List of municipalities of Estonia
