= Kärla Parish =

Former municipality of Estonia

Coordinates: 58°20′09″N 22°15′35″E

Kärla Parish Kärla vald
- Former municipality of Estonia
- Flag Coat of arms

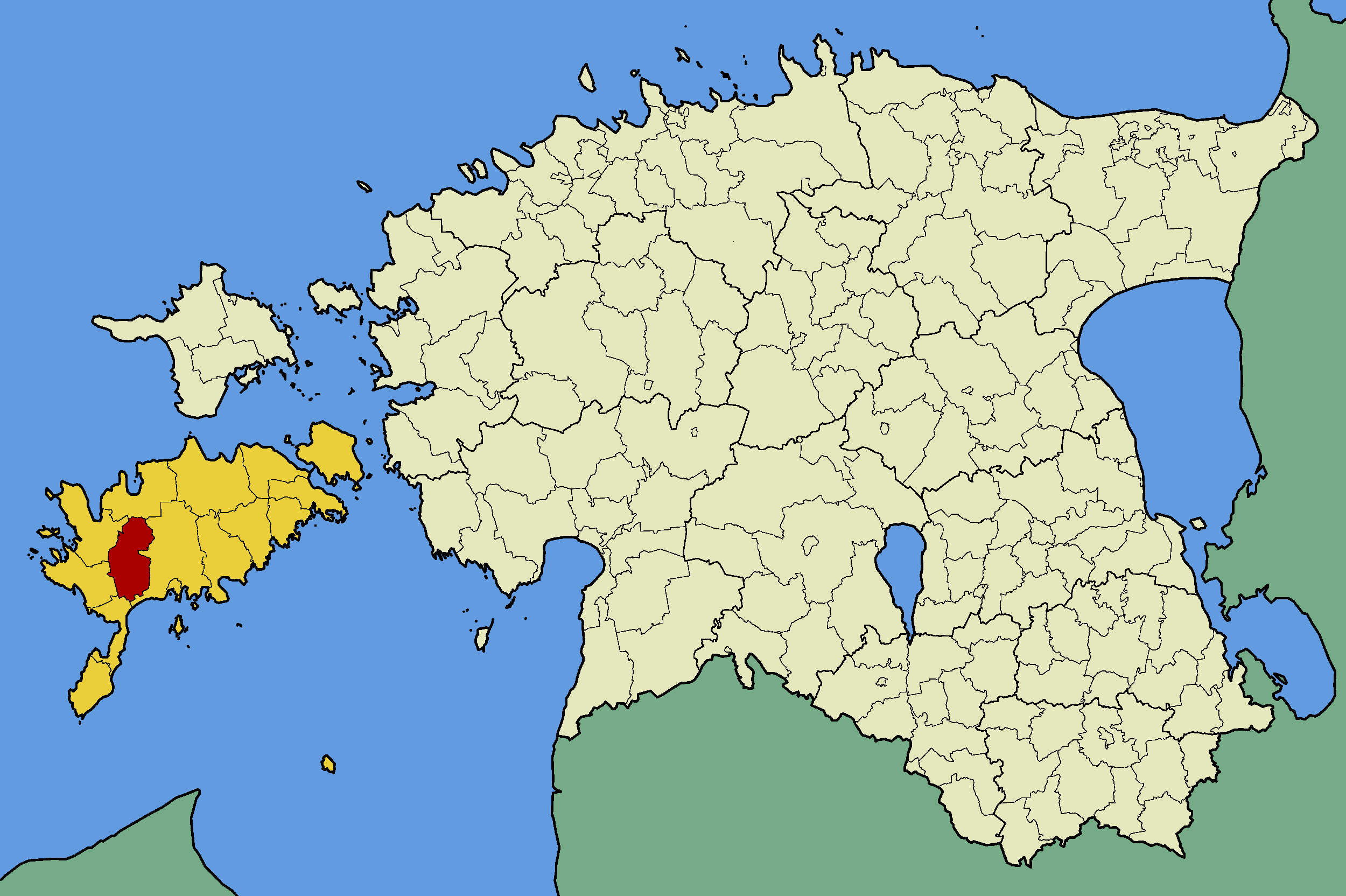
- Kärla Parish within Saare County.
- Country: Estonia
- County: Saare County
- Administrative centre: Kärla

Area
  - Total: 217.87 km^{2} (84.12 sq mi)

Population (01.01.2007)
  - Total: 1,803
  - Density: 8.276/km^{2} (21.43/sq mi)
- Website: www.karlavald.ee

Kärla Parish was a municipality in Saare County, Estonia. In 2014, it was merged with the municipalities of Kaarma and Lümanda to become the Lääne-Saare municipality.

The parish consisted of one small town, Kärla, and 22 villages: Anepesa, Arandi, Hirmuste, Jõempa, Käesla, Kandla, Karida, Kirikuküla, Kogula, Kulli, Kuuse, Kõrkküla, Mätasselja, Mõnnuste, Nõmpa, Paevere, Paiküla, Sauvere, Sõmera, Ulje, Vendise and Vennati. The municipality had a population of 1,803 (as of 1 January 2007) and covered an area of 217.87 km² (84.12 mi²).
