= Lümanda Parish =

Former municipality of Estonia

Coordinates: 58°17′04″N 22°02′21″E

Lümanda Parish Lümanda vald
- Former municipality of Estonia
- Flag Coat of arms

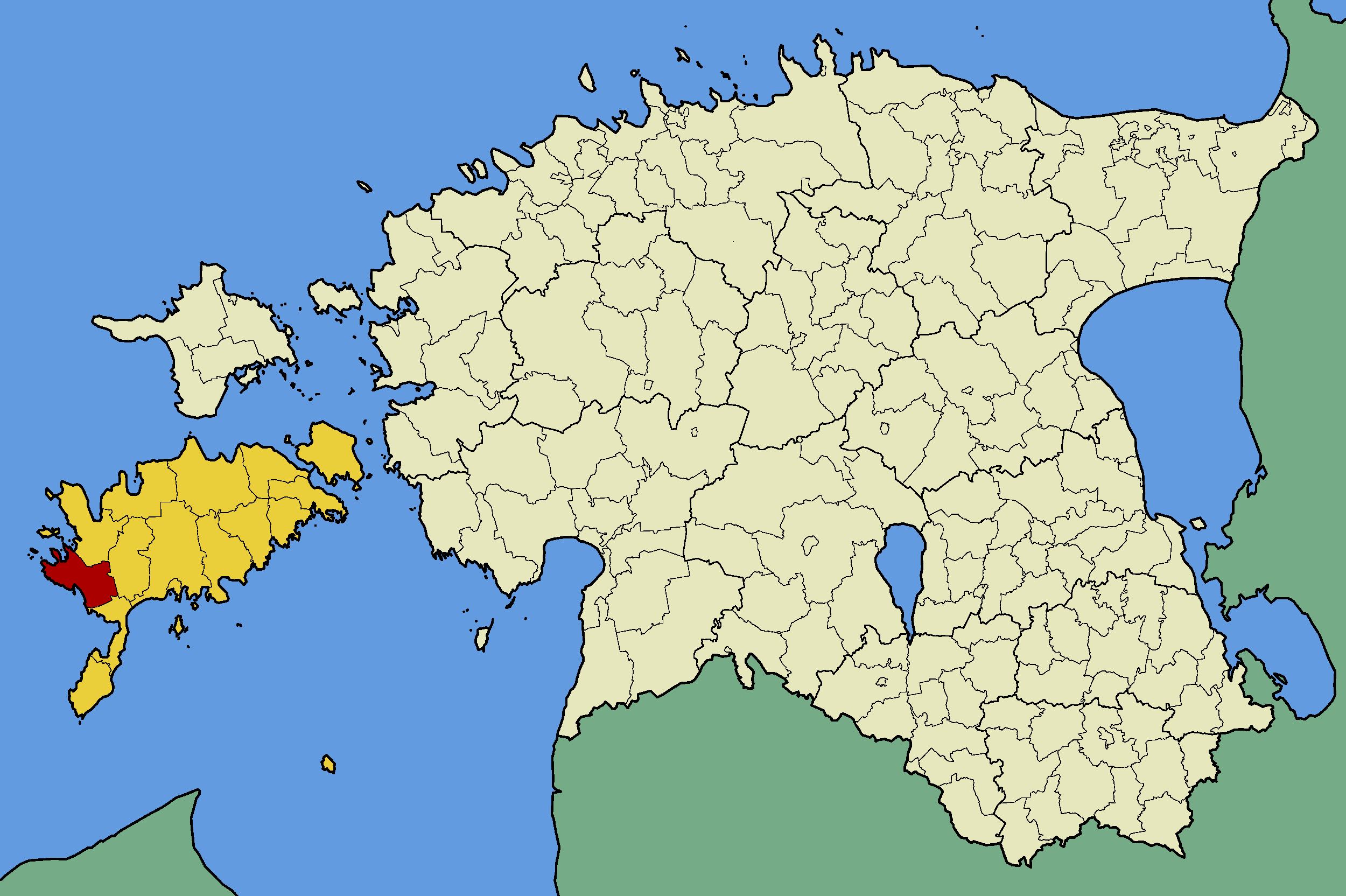
- Lümanda Parish within Saare County.
- Country: Estonia
- County: Saare County
- Administrative centre: Lümanda

Area
  - Total: 199.49 km^{2} (77.02 sq mi)

Population (01.01.2007)
  - Total: 876
  - Density: 4.39/km^{2} (11.4/sq mi)
- Website: www.lymanda.ee

Lümanda Parish was a municipality in Saare County, Estonia. It had a population of 876 (as of 1 January 2007) and covered an area of 199.49 km^{2} (77.02 mi^{2}). In 2014, it was merged with the municipalities of Kärla and Kaarma to become the Lääne-Saare municipality.

== Villages ==
Atla - Austla - Eeriksaare - Himmiste - Jõgela - Karala - Kärdu - Kipi - Koimla - Koki - Koovi - Kotlandi - Kulli - Kuusnõmme - Leedri - Lümanda - Metsapere - Mõisaküla - Põlluküla - Riksu - Taritu - Vahva - Vana-Lahetaguse - Varpe - Viidu
