= Koimla Nature Reserve =

Protected area in Estonia

- Location within Estonia
- Location: Estonia
- Coordinates: 58°13′N 22°10′E
- Area: 32 ha (79 acres)
- Established: 2013

Koimla Nature Reserve is a nature reserve which is located in Saare County, Estonia.

The area of the nature reserve is 32 ha.

The protected area was founded in 2013 to protect valuable habitat types and threatened species in Koimla village (former Lümanda Parish).
