= Saaremaa Parish =

Municipality of Estonia

Saaremaa Municipality Saaremaa vald
- Municipality of Estonia
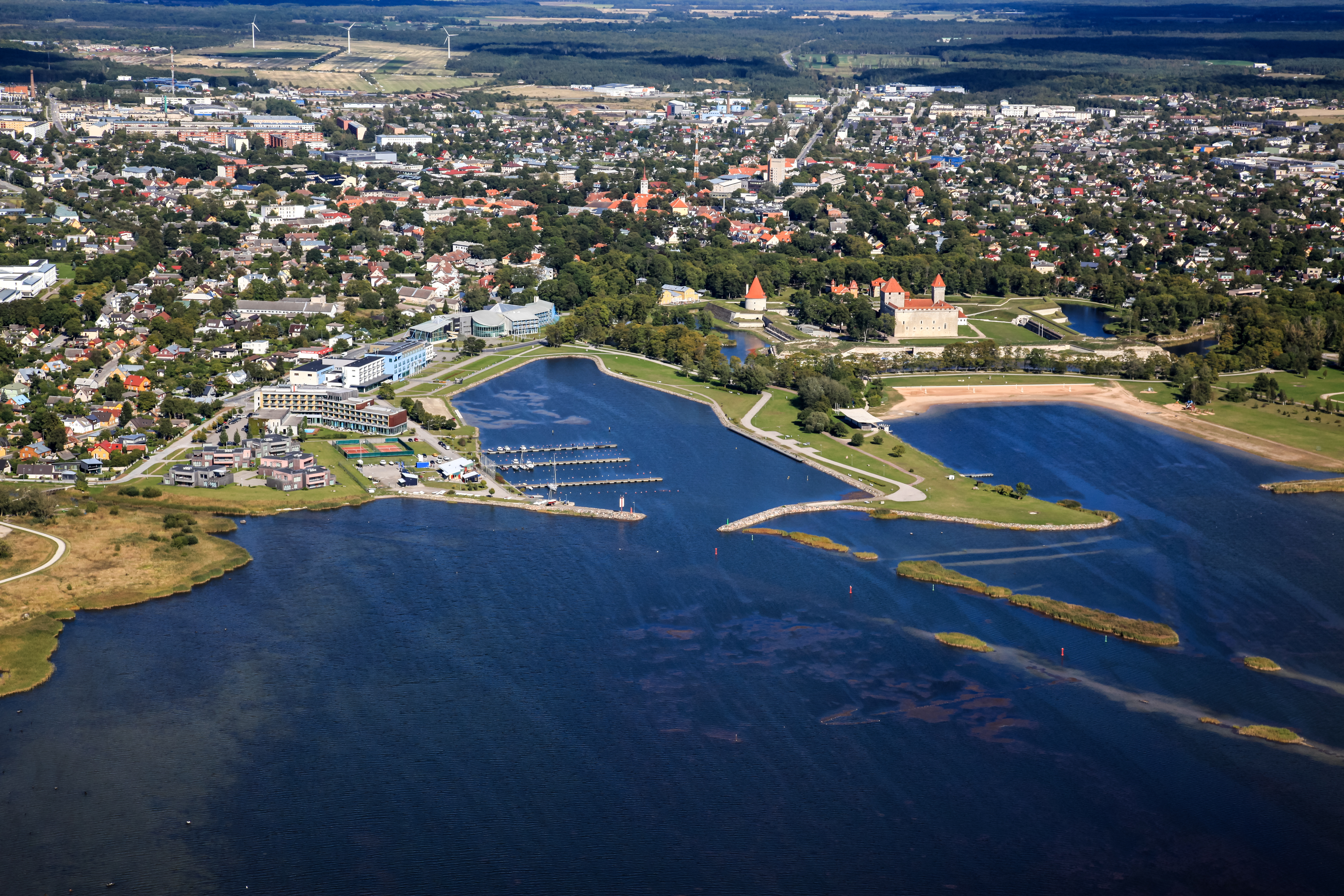
- Kuressaare town and harbour

- Flag Coat of arms

- Saaremaa Parish
- Country: Estonia
- County: Saare
- Administrative center: Kuressaare

Government
  - Mayor: Rainer Antsaar

Area
  - Total: 2,718 km^{2} (1,049 sq mi)

Population (2024)
  - Total: 30,304
  - Density: 11.15/km^{2} (28.88/sq mi)
- Time zone: UTC+2 (EET)
  - Summer (DST): UTC+3 (EEST)
- ISO 3166 code: EE-714
- Website: www.saaremaavald.ee

Saaremaa Parish, also known as Saaremaa Municipality (Estonian: Saaremaa vald), is a municipality in Saare County in western Estonia. It is the largest municipality by land area and largest rural municipality – or parish – by population in Estonia. The administrative centre of the municipality is its only town Kuressaare.

It is one of three parishes comprising the county, along with Muhu and Ruhnu Parish. It was formed following the 2017 Estonian municipal reform on 21 October 2017 on the basis of all twelve former Saaremaa municipalities: Kuressaare town and Kihelkonna, Laimjala, Leisi, Lääne-Saare, Mustjala, Orissaare, Pihtla, Pöide, Salme, Torgu and Valjala parishes.

== History ==
Saaremaa Municipality was formed following the 2017 Estonian municipal reform on 21 October 2017 on the basis of all twelve former Saaremaa municipalities: Kuressaare town and Kihelkonna, Laimjala, Leisi, Lääne-Saare, Mustjala, Orissaare, Pihtla, Pöide, Salme, Torgu and Valjala parishes.

Previously, in 2014, the municipalities of Kaarma, Kärla, and Lümanda had already merged, and initially wanted to use the name Saaremaa municipality for the merged municipality, but later decided in favour of the name of Lääne-Saare municipality.

In 2014, it became clear at a meeting of the heads of Saaremaa municipalities that other county municipalities would also not be against a merger, and the respective merger committees began their work as early as 2015. Although Pöide municipality did not initially join the merger agreement signed on 1 December 2016, the Government of Estonia, based on the proposal of the regional committee, decided to forcibly merge Pöide municipality with the upcoming Saaremaa municipality. As a result, the Pöide municipality council also decided to join the merger negotiations.

Timeline of Saaremaa municipality mergers

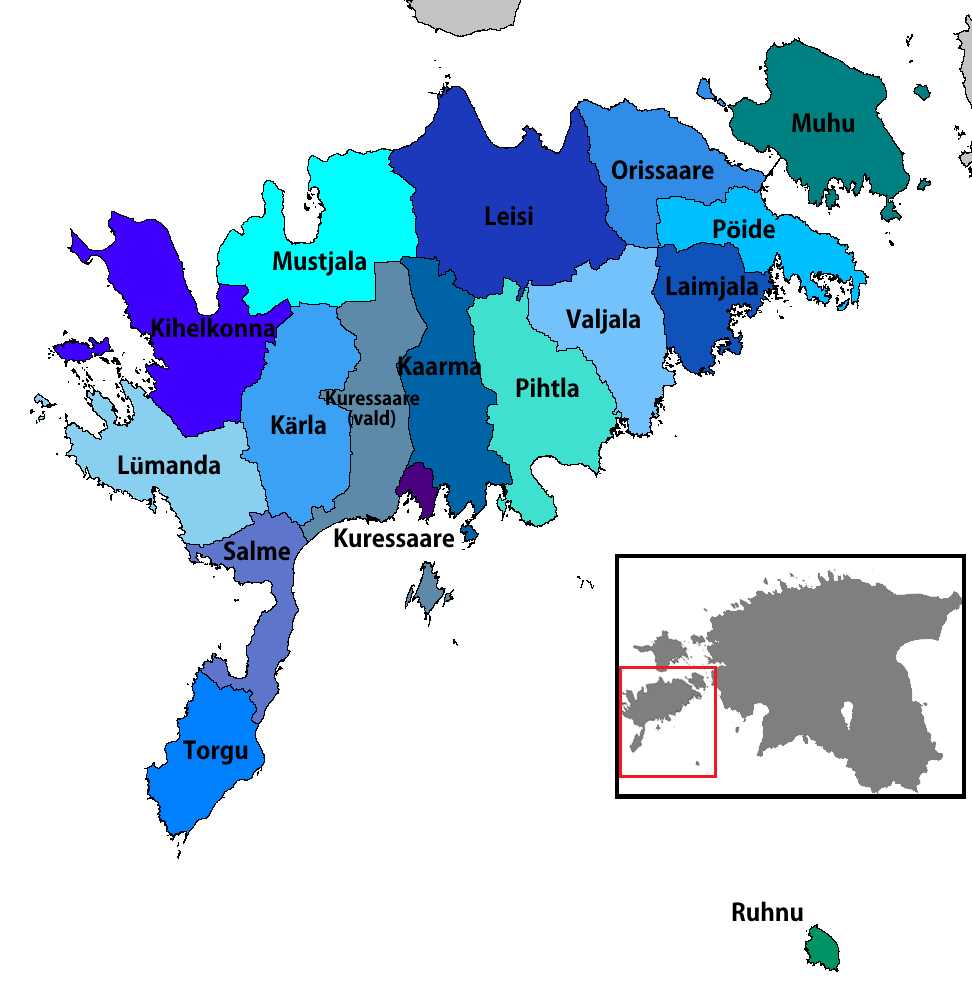
1992–1999

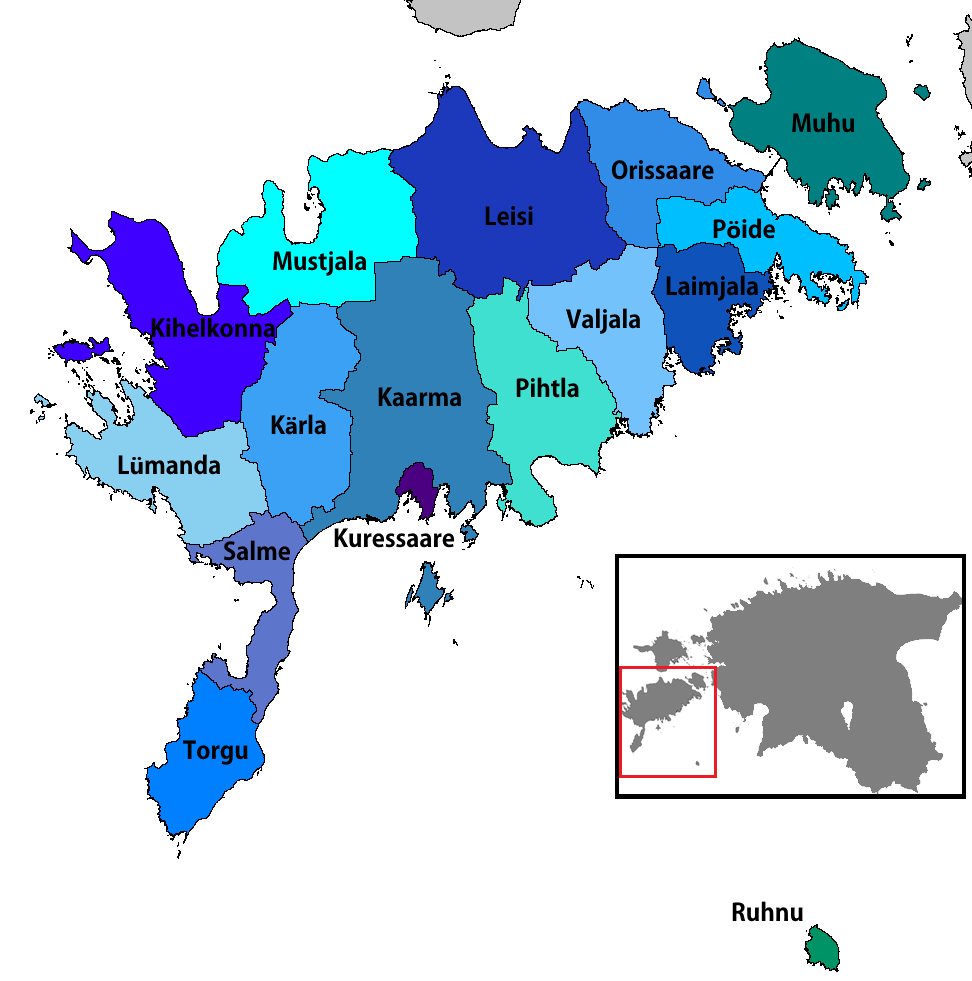
1999–2014

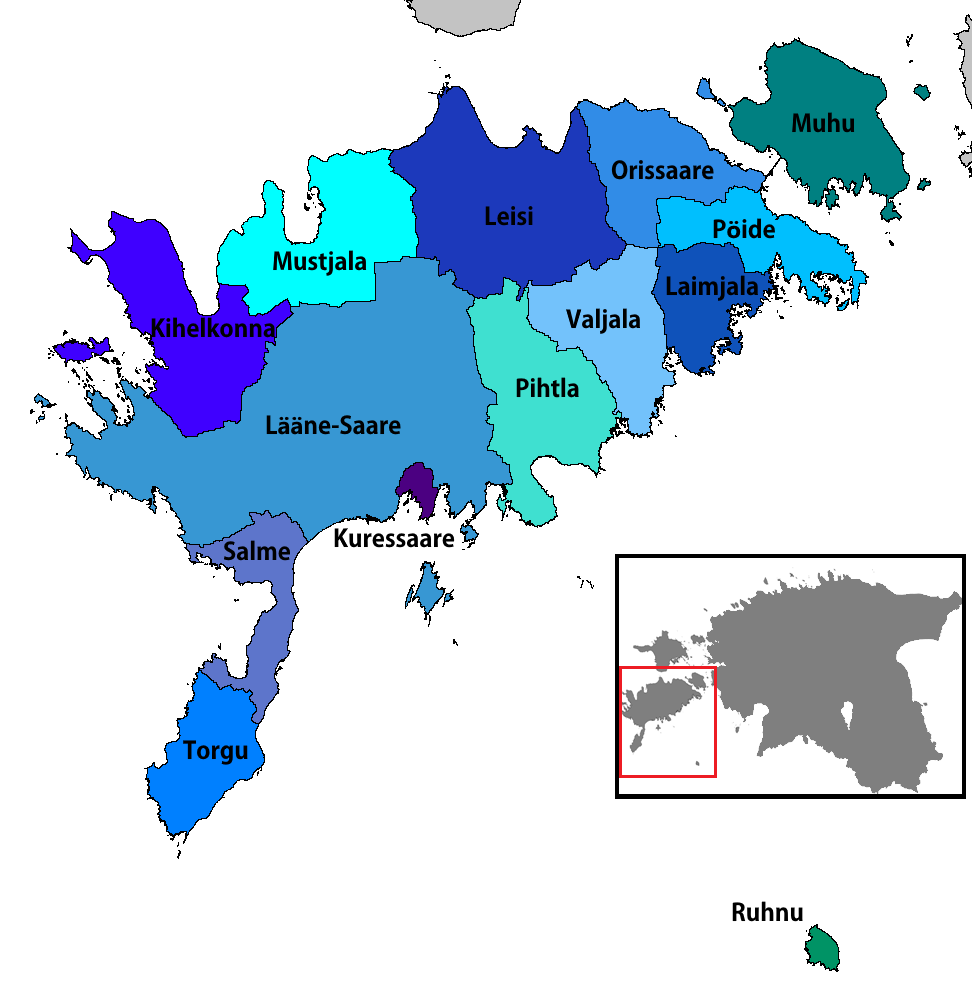
2014–2017

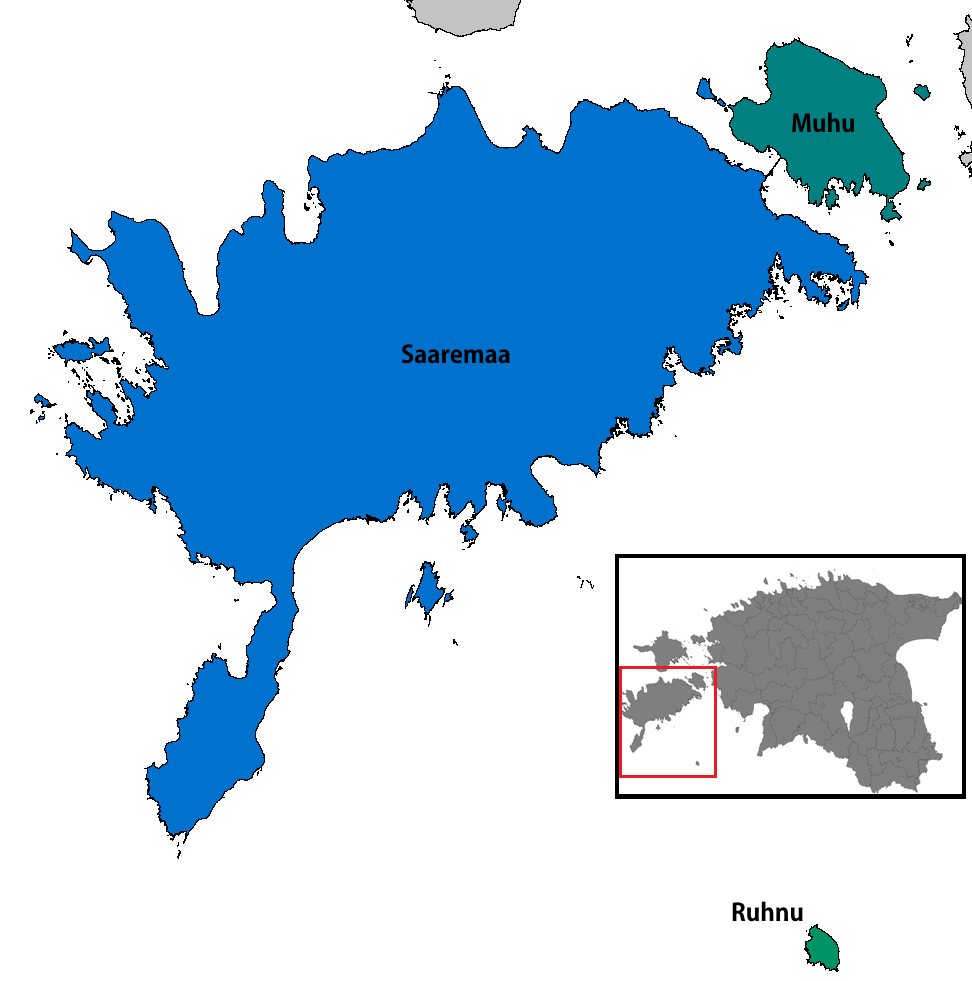
2017–...

== Government ==
The municipality is governed by the Saaremaa Municipality Council, which consists of 31 members elected to four-year terms via party list. The mayor and the cabinet are elected by the municipality council.

The current mayor is Rainer Antsaar. The current chairman of the municipality council is Koit Voojärv.

== Districts ==
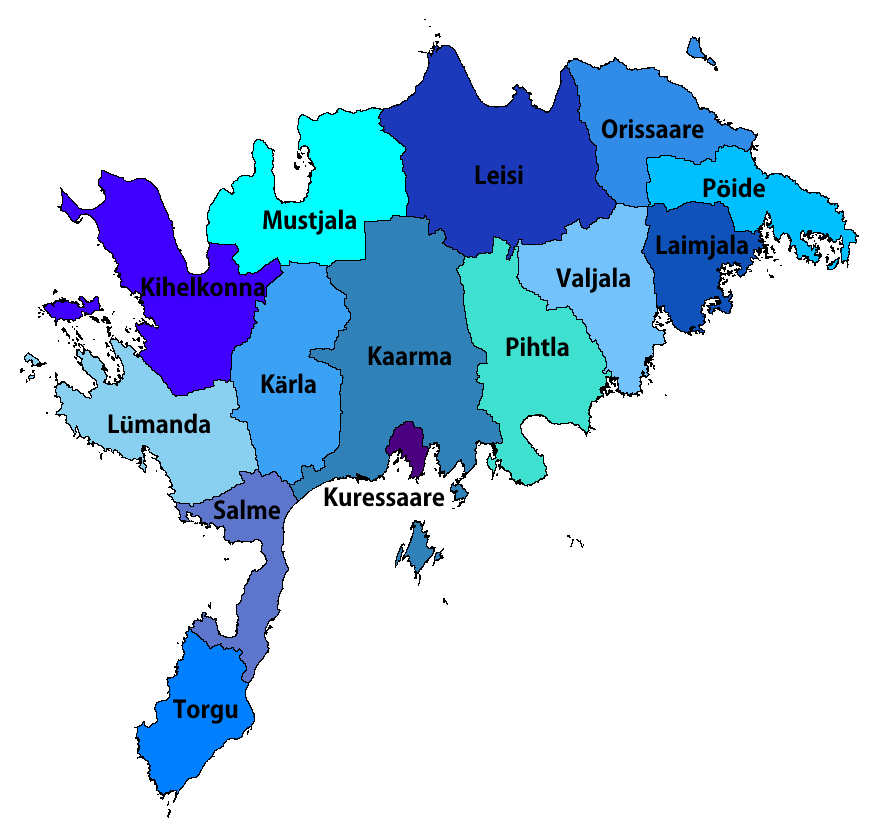
Districts of Saaremaa and the town of Kuressaare

Saaremaa Municipality is divided into thirteen (rural) districts – osavallad. The aim of the districts is to maintain local initiative and identity, to involve residents in deciding local issues and to represent local interests. The town of Kuressaare is a separate territorial unit, not part of any district. It is represented by the Kuressaare Citizens Committee (Kuressaare linnakodaniku komisjon).

Service centres have been established in every district to provide and manage public services.

== Settlements ==
=== Town ===
Kuressaare

=== Boroughs ===
Aste, Kihelkonna, Kudjape, Kärla, Leisi, Nasva, Orissaare, Salme, Valjala

=== Villages ===
- Aaviku
- Abaja
- Abruka
- Abula
- Allikalahe
- Anepesa
- Angla
- Anijala
- Anseküla
- Ansi
- Arandi
- Ardla
- Are
- Ariste
- Arju
- Aru
- Aruste
- Aste
- Asuka
- Asuküla
- Asva
- Atla
- Audla
- Aula-Vintri
- Austla
- Easte
- Eeriksaare
- Eikla
- Eiste
- Endla
- Ennu
- Haamse
- Haapsu
- Haeska
- Hakjala
- Hiievälja
- Himmiste
- Hindu
- Hirmuste
- Hämmelepa
- Hänga
- Hübja
- Iide
- Iilaste
- Ilpla
- Imara
- Imavere
- Irase
- Iruste
- Jaani
- Jauni
- Jootme
- Jursi
- Jõe
- Jõelepa
- Jõempa
- Jõgela
- Jõiste
- Jämaja
- Järise
- Järve
- Järveküla
- Jööri
- Kaali
- Kaali-Liiva
- Kaarma
- Kaarma-Jõe
- Kaarma-Kirikuküla
- Kaarma-Kungla
- Kaarmise
- Kaavi
- Kahtla
- Kahutsi
- Kailuka
- Kaimri
- Kaisa
- Kaisvere
- Kakuna
- Kalju
- Kallaste
- Kallemäe
- Kalli
- Kalma
- Kalmu
- Kandla
- Kangrusselja
- Kanissaare
- Kapra
- Karala
- Kareda
- Kargi
- Karida
- Karja
- Karujärve
- Karuste
- Kasti
- Kaubi
- Kaugatoma
- Kaunispe
- Kavandi
- Kehila
- Kellamäe
- Keskranna
- Keskvere
- Kihelkonna-Liiva
- Kiirassaare
- Kingli
- Kipi
- Kiratsi
- Kirderanna
- Kiritu
- Kiruma
- Kogula
- Koidula
- Koiduvälja
- Koigi
- Koigi-Väljaküla
- Koikla
- Koimla
- Koki
- Koksi
- Koovi
- Kopli
- Kotlandi
- Kotsma
- Kugalepa
- Kuiste
- Kuke
- Kungla
- Kuninguste
- Kuralase
- Kuremetsa
- Kurevere
- Kuumi
- Kuuse
- Kuusiku
- Kuusnõmme
- Kõiguste
- Kõinastu
- Kõljala
- Kõnnu
- Kõriska
- Kõrkküla
- Kõrkvere
- Kõruse
- Kõruse-Metsaküla
- Kõõru
- Käesla
- Käku
- Käo
- Kärdu
- Kärla-Kirikuküla
- Kärla-Kulli
- Kärneri
- Kübassaare
- Küdema
- Külma
- Laadjala
- Laadla
- Laevaranna
- Laheküla
- Lahetaguse
- Laimjala
- Laoküla
- Lassi
- Laugu
- Laugu-Liiva
- Leedri
- Leina
- Leisi
- Levala
- Liigalaskma
- Liiküla
- Liiva
- Liivanõmme
- Liiva-Putla
- Liivaranna
- Lilbi
- Lindmetsa
- Linnaka
- Linnuse
- Loona
- Lussu
- Luulupe
- Lõmala
- Lõpi
- Lõu
- Lõupõllu
- Läbara
- Länga
- Lätiniidi
- Läägi
- Läätsa
- Lööne
- Lülle
- Lümanda
- Lümanda-Kulli
- Maantee
- Maasi
- Maleva
- Masa
- Matsiranna
- Meedla
- Mehama
- Meiuste
- Merise
- Metsaküla
- Metsalõuka
- Metsapere
- Metsara
- Metsaääre
- Metsküla
- Moosi
- Mui
- Mujaste
- Mullutu
- Muraja
- Muratsi
- Murika
- Mustjala
- Mustla
- Mõisaküla
- Mõnnuste
- Mõntu
- Mäebe
- Mäeküla
- Mägi-Kurdla
- Mändjala
- Männiku
- Mässa
- Mätasselja
- Mätja
- Möldri
- Nava
- Neeme
- Neemi
- Nenu
- Nihatu
- Ninase
- Nurme
- Nõmjala
- Nõmme
- Nõmpa
- Nässuma
- Odalätsi
- Oessaare
- Ohessaare
- Ohtja
- Oitme
- Oju
- Orinõmme
- Oti
- Paaste
- Paatsa
- Paevere
- Pahapilli
- Pahavalla
- Paiküla
- Paimala
- Paju-Kurdla
- Pajumõisa
- Pamma
- Pammana
- Panga
- Parasmetsa
- Parila
- Peederga
- Pidula
- Pidula-Kuusiku
- Pihtla
- Piila
- Poka
- Praakli
- Puka
- Pulli
- Purtsa
- Põlluküla
- Põripõllu
- Pähkla
- Pärni
- Pärsama
- Pöide
- Pöide-Keskvere
- Pöitse
- Püha
- Püha-Kõnnu
- Rahtla
- Rahu
- Rahuste
- Randküla
- Randvere
- Rannaküla
- Ratla
- Raugu
- Reeküla
- Reina
- Reo
- Ridala
- Riksu
- Roobaka
- Rootsiküla
- Ruhve
- Räimaste
- Räägi
- Rahniku
- Röösa
- Saareküla
- Saaremetsa
- Sagariste
- Saia
- Saikla
- Sakla
- Salavere
- Salu
- Sandla
- Sauaru
- Saue-Mustla
- Saue-Putla
- Sauvere
- Selgase
- Selja
- Sepa
- Sepise
- Siiksaare
- Sikassaare
- Silla
- Soela
- Soodevahe
- Sundimetsa
- Sutu
- Suure-Rootsi
- Suurna
- Suur-Pahila
- Suur-Rahula
- Suur-Randvere
- Sõmera
- Sõrve-Hindu
- Sääre
- Taaliku
- Tagamõisa
- Tagaranna
- Tagavere
- Tahula
- Talila
- Tammese
- Tammuna
- Tareste
- Taritu
- Tehumardi
- Tiirimetsa
- Tiitsuotsa
- Tirbi
- Tohku
- Toomalõuka
- Torgu-Mõisaküla
- Tornimäe
- Triigi
- Tuiu
- Tumala
- Turja
- Tutku
- Tõlli
- Tõlluste
- Tõnija
- Tõre
- Tõrise
- Tõru
- Täätsi
- Türju
- Uduvere
- Ula
- Ulje
- Undimäe
- Undva
- Unguma
- Unimäe
- Upa
- Uuemõisa
- Vahva
- Vaigu
- Vaigu-Rannaküla
- Vaivere
- Valjala-Ariste
- Valjala-Kogula
- Valjala-Nurme
- Vanakubja
- Vana-Lahetaguse
- Vanalõve
- Vanamõisa
- Vantri
- Varkja
- Varpe
- Vatsküla
- Vedruka
- Veere
- Veeremäe
- Veeriku
- Vendise
- Vennati
- Veske
- Vestla
- Viidu
- Viidu-Mäebe
- Viira
- Viki
- Vilidu
- Vilsandi
- Viltina
- Vintri
- Virita
- Võhma
- Võrsna
- Väike-Pahila
- Väike-Rahula
- Väike-Rootsi
- Väike-Ula
- Väike-Võhma
- Väkra
- Väljaküla
- Väljamõisa
- Välta
- Õeste
- Õha
- Ööriku
- Üru
- Üüdibe
- Üüvere

== Notable people ==
- Fabian Gottlieb von Bellingshausen (1778 in Lahetaguse – 1852), a Baltic German Russian cartographer and naval officer
- John Christian Bechler (1784 – 1857), a Moravian bishop, composer and organist.
- Alexander von Güldenstubbe (1800 in Kaarma - 1884), a Baltic German general of the Imperial Russian Army.
- Peeter All (1829 at Loona – 1898), fisherman, farmer, ship's captain, shipowner, rescuer of mariners and salvage diver.
- Oskar Kallas (1868 in Kirikuküla – 1946), diplomat, linguist and folklorist
- Jakob Mändmets (1871 in Paiküla – 1930), journalist and writer of stories, novellas and short stories
- Hugo Wittrock (1873 in Laugu – 1958), a Baltic German merchant and politician, Lord Mayor of Riga in WWII
- Arthur von Buxhoevden (1882 at Muratsi manor – 1964), a Baltic German military colonel
- Peeter Süda (1883 in Viki – 1920), composer, helped establish the Estonian Theatre and Music Museum
- Artur Toom (1884 in Sagariste – 1942), ornithologist and conservationist who worked on Vilsandi National Park
- Friido Kirs (1889 in Pihtla – 1948), schoolteacher and politician, elected Mayor of Pihtla Parish in 1919
- Aleksander Antson (1899 in Võrsna – 1945), journalist, writer, and track and field athlete.
- Gustav Ränk (1902 in Nõmme − 1998), ethnologist and Director of the Estonian National Museum
- Aleksander Laak (1907 in Pöide Parish – 1960), a lieutenant and the commander of the Jägala concentration camp

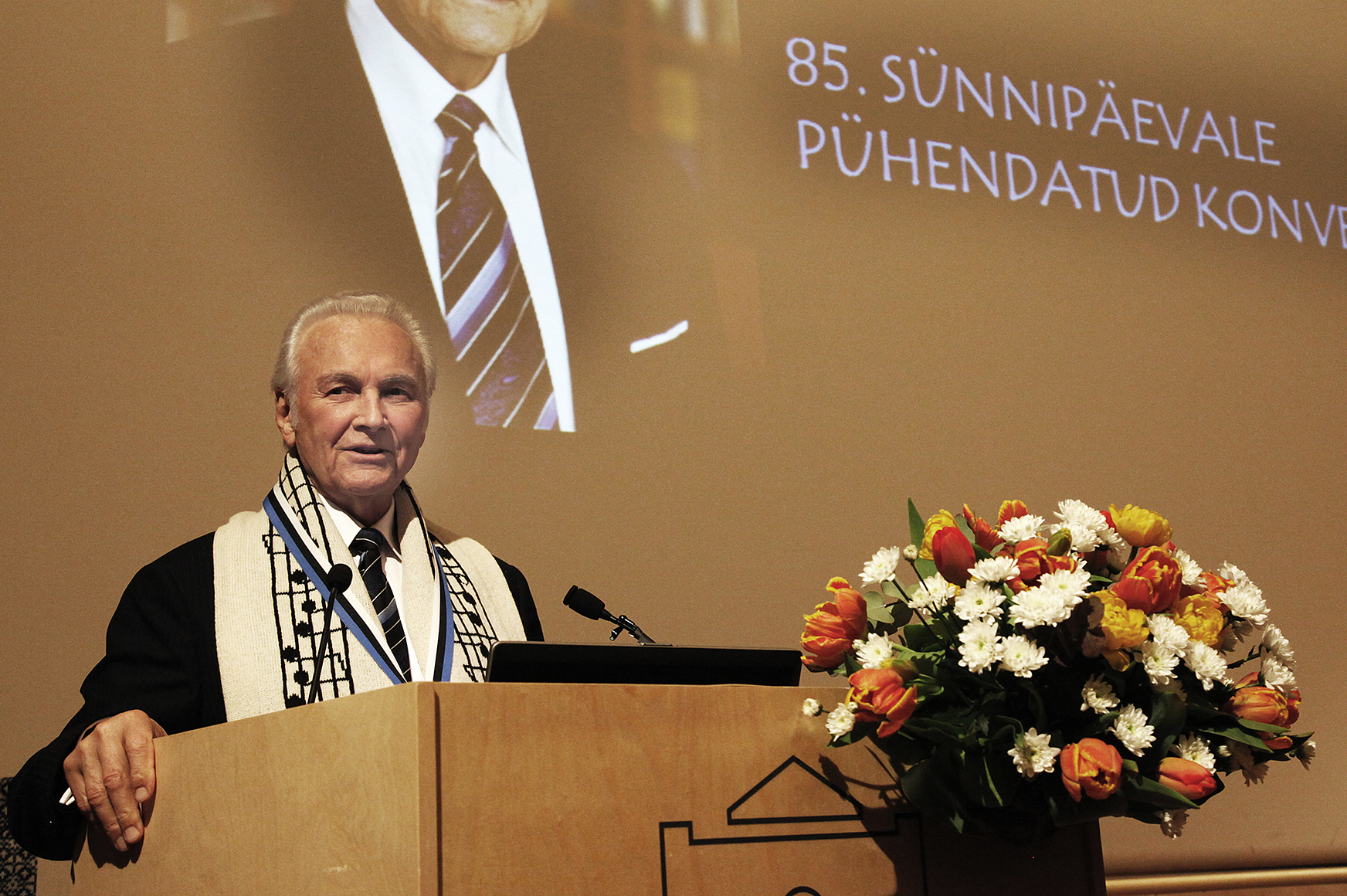
Arnold Rüütel, 2013

- Karl-Richard Idlane (1910 in Kaarma – 1942), footballer, played 31 games for Estonia
- Arnold Rüütel (1928 in Pahavalla – 2024), politician, third President of Estonia, 2001 to 2006.
- Johannes Hint (1914 in Kuusnõmme – 1985), scientist, invented building material Silikaltsiit, (ET wiki)
- Salme Poopuu (1939 in Rahtla – 2017), filmmaker, actress, producer and director.
- Vello Vinn (born 1939 in Sõrve), a printmaker.
- Henno Käo (1942 in Allikalahe – 2004), children's writer, book illustrator, poet, and musician
- Tarmo Kõuts (born 1953 in Sandla), politician and former Commander of the Estonian Defence Forces.
- Jaan Õunapuu (born 1958 in Mustjala), politician, governor Tartu County 1993/2003 and Deputy Mayor of Tartu, 2016/2017.
- Liia Hänni (born 1946 in Atla), an astrophysicist, social activist and former politician
- Ain Anger (born 1971 in Kihelkonna), an opera bass.
- Veiko Õunpuu (born 1972 in Saaremaa), film director and screenwriter, his films are usually slow-paced with eccentric characters.
