= Koidula =

Koidula may refer to:

- Lydia Koidula (1843–1886), Estonian poet
- Koidula, Võru County, village in Setomaa Parish, Võru County
  - Koidula railway station
- Koidula, Saare County, village in Kaarma Parish, Saare County
