= Kipi =

Kipi, KIPI may refer to:

- KDE Image Plugin Interface
- Kipi, Estonia
- Kipoi, Evros
- Kipoi, Ioannina
- Kipi Ben Kipod, a Sesame Street character
- Samuel Kipi (1825–1879), Royal Governor of the island Hawaii
- KIPI (FM), a radio station (93.5 FM) licensed to serve Eagle Butte, South Dakota, United States
