= Laoküla =

Laoküla may refer to:

- Laoküla, Harju County, village in Harju County, Estonia
- Laoküla, Saare County, village in Saare County, Estonia
