= Metsapere =

Metsapere may refer to:

- Metsapere, Hiiu County, village in Emmaste Parish, Hiiu County, Estonia
- Metsapere, Saare County, village in Lümanda Parish, Saare County, Estonia
