= Heli Lääts =

Estonian singer (1932–2018)

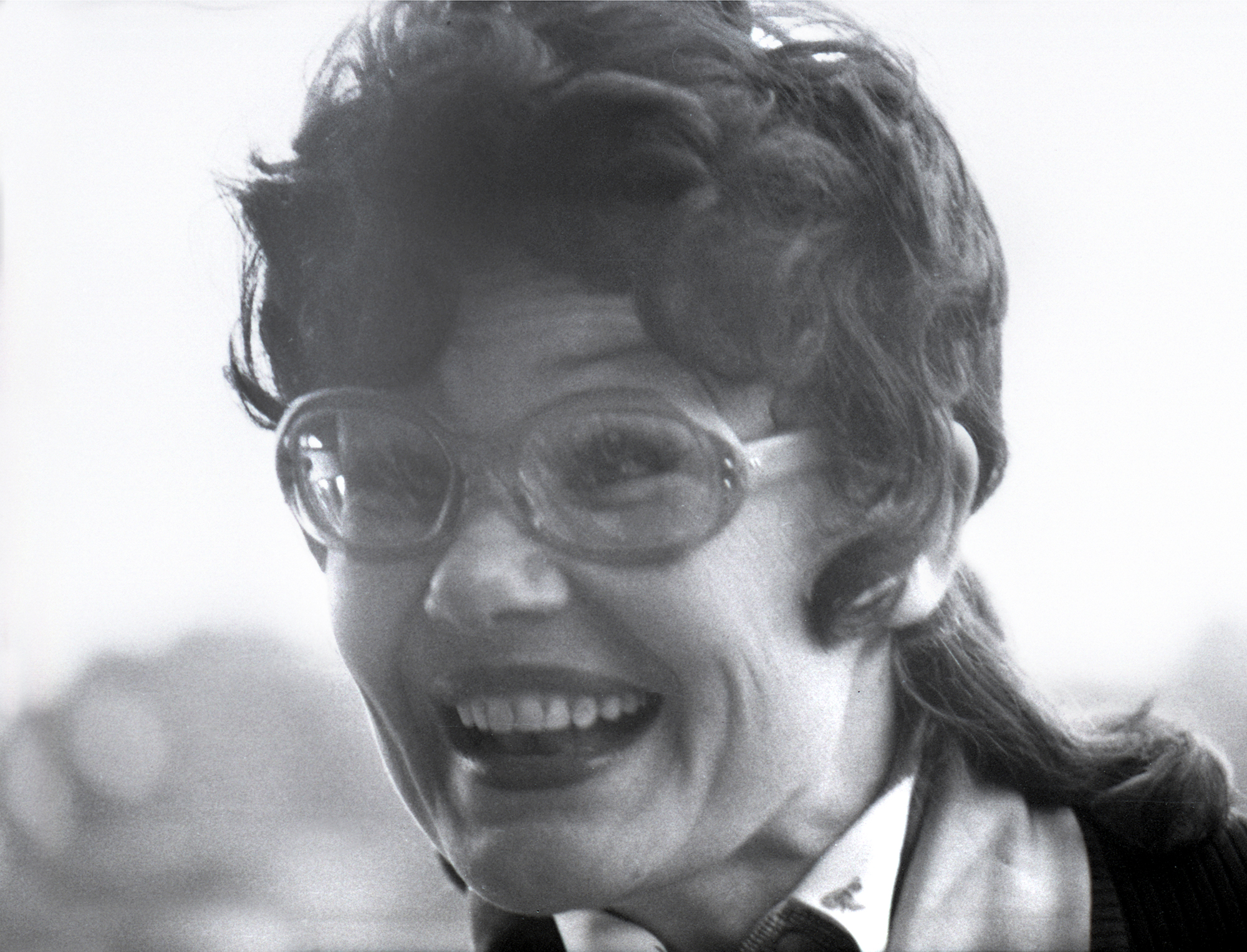
- Lääts in 1974.

Background information
- Also known as: Heli Saul
- Born: 24 June 1932; Kuressaare, Saare County, Estonia
- Died: 16 February 2018 (aged 85) Tallinn, Harju County, Estonia
- Genres: Estrada, chamber, pop, polka, jazz
- Occupation: Singer
- Instrument: Vocals
- Years active: 1955–2006
- Label: Melodiya

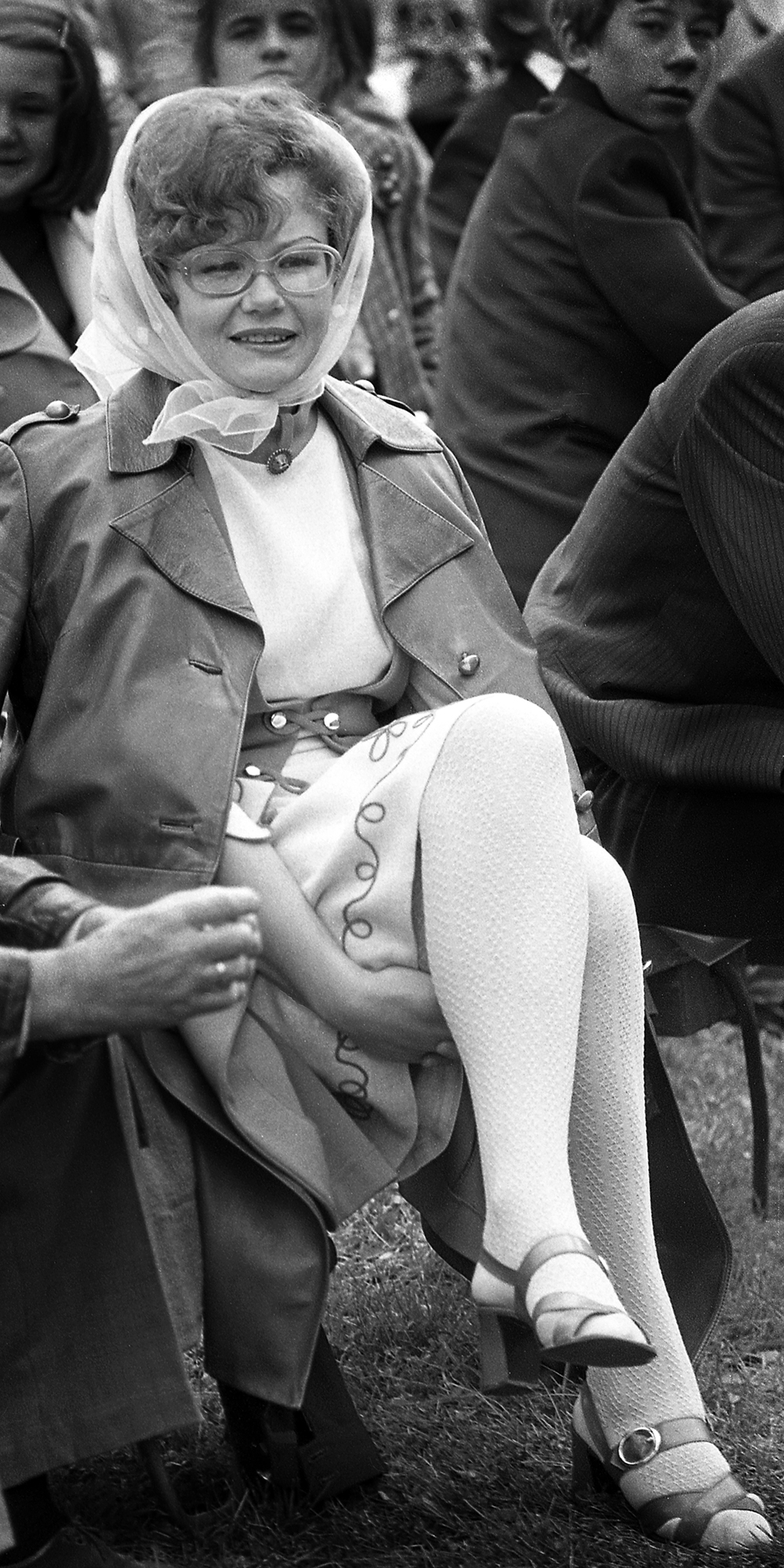
Lääts at the Tallinn Song Festival Grounds in 1974.

Heli Lääts (24 June 1932 – 16 February 2018) was an Estonian singer (mezzo-soprano) whose career began in the mid-1950s. Lääts predominantly performed estrada, chamber, pop, polka, and jazz music.

== Early life and education ==
Heli Lääts was born in Kuressaare, on the island of Saaremaa to Vladimir and Julia Lääts (née Allik). She was the youngest of three children and only girl. Her eldest brother was chemist Koit Lääts (1928–2008) and her other brother was physicist Valdur Lääts (1929–2002). She spent her early years in the village of Sauvere. Following the German occupation of Estonia during World War II, Lääts' mother, a schoolteacher, was executed by German soldiers by gunshot on 18 November 1941 in a reprisal killing of villagers for the assassination of a German military officer. After the death of her mother, she was raised by her aunt Anna. Her father later remarried.

Lääts later attended primary and secondary schools in Kivimäe and Rahumäe. In 1950, while contemplating attending the University of Tartu to study physical education, she was singing in a mixed-choir under the direction of Joosep Aavik. The choir traveled to Tallinn for the XIII Estonian Song Festival and Aavik introduced Lääts to singer Aleksander Arder, who, after hearing Lääts sing, asked her why she didn't wish to train as a singer. After a year of student teaching in Kuressaare, she changed her plans and enrolled at the Tallinn State Conservatory (now, the Estonian Academy of Music and Theatre) in Tallinn, graduating in 1955. Her first year at the Conservatory, she was under the direction of singer Georg Ots.

In 1960, Lääts graduated with a degree in singing from the Conservatory, having studied under Tiit Kuusik. She was the first Estonian singer to receive a qualification in estrada and chamber singing.

== Career ==
In 1956, Lääts began to perform as an estrada singer with the Emil Laansoo Ensemble and the Eesti Raadio Estrada Orchestra. Estrada, during the Soviet period, usually referred to performers of traditional popular music (although the actual term Estrada (stage) is much wider). Estrada music was generally written by professional composers and poets. The songs were designed for vocal prowess, had clear, catchy melodies, and accompaniment is given to a secondary role.

In 1957, Lääts joined many other estrada performers and the ensemble Metronoom to participate in the World Festival of Youth and Students in Moscow. In 1958, Lääts was the first Estonian singer to win a title in a Soviet Union-wide estrada contest.

From 1957 until 1961, Lääts sang in the Eesti Raadio Women's Trio, and from 1957 until 1987, she performed as a soloist with the Estonian SSR State Philharmonic (now, the Estonian National Symphony Orchestra). From 1966 until 1974, she was employed as a vocal teacher at the Philharmonic's estrada studio.

During her career, Lääts also recorded and performed a number of children's songs. She also released several albums, recorded music for Eesti Raadio and recorded songs with Mikk Mikiver, Uno Loop, and Jaak Joala. Some of her best-known songs in Estonia include "Tsirkus," "Kaunid baleriinid," "Oma laulu ei leia ma üles," "Kevad ja päike," and "Tänav, pink ja puu."

== Personal life and death ==
Heli Lääts was married to conductor and pianist Peeter Saul for fifty-six years. Prior to their marriage in Kadrina in 1958, they had been in a relationship for two years. Saul died in 2014. The couple had two sons, Indrek and Kaarel. Lääts died of natural causes at age 85 on 16 February 2018 in Tallinn. She was buried in Tallinn's Metsakalmistu cemetery.

== Awards and recognition ==
Lääts was awarded the title of Merited Artist of the Estonian SSR in 1970 and People's Artist of the Estonian SSR in 1976. In 1980, she received the Order of the Badge of Honour. In 2004, she was awarded the Order of the White Star, V Class. That same year, she won one of four Estonian National Culture Foundation Lifetime Achievement Awards.
