= Karala, Estonia =

Village in Estonia

Coordinates: 58°16′N 21°55′E

Karala
- Village
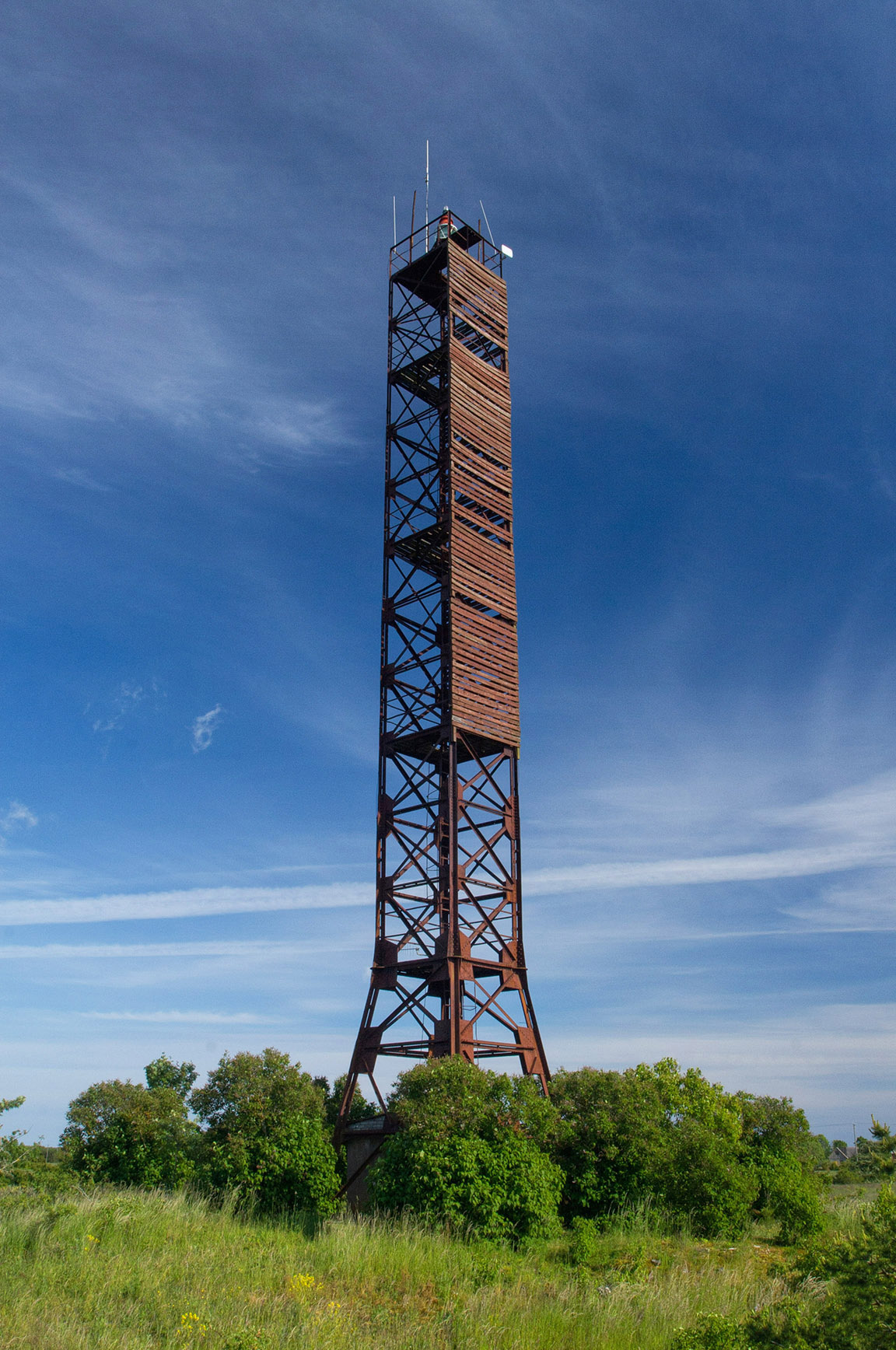
- Karala tulepaak
- Interactive map of Karala
- Country: Estonia
- County: Saare County
- Parish: Saaremaa Parish
- Time zone: UTC+2 (EET)
  - Summer (DST): UTC+3 (EEST)

Karala, Estonia is a village in Saaremaa Parish,(previously Lümanda Parish), Saare County in western Estonia.

Before the administrative reform in 2017, the village was in Lääne-Saare Parish.
