= Aste, Estonia (village) =

Village in Estonia

Aste
- Village
- Location within Estonia
- Coordinates: 58°22′35″N 22°25′34″E
- Country: Estonia
- County: Saare County
- Parish: Saaremaa Parish
- Time zone: UTC+2 (EET)
  - Summer (DST): UTC+3 (EEST)

Aste is a village in Saaremaa Parish, Saare County in western Estonia.

Before the administrative reform in 2017, the village was in Lääne-Saare Parish.
