= Kandla, Estonia =

Village in Estonia

Kandla
- Village
- Location within Estonia
- Coordinates: 58°22′01″N 22°17′53″E
- Country: Estonia
- County: Saare County
- Parish: Saaremaa Parish
- Time zone: UTC+2 (EET)
  - Summer (DST): UTC+3 (EEST)

Kandla is a village in Saaremaa Parish, Saare County in western Estonia. It is located 21.4 kilometres (13.3 mi) by road northwest of Kuressaare, just to the northwest of Jõempa.

Before the administrative reform in 2017, the village was in Lääne-Saare Parish.
