= Lääne-Saare Parish =

Former municipality of Estonia

Coordinates: 58.3333°N 22.2500°E

Lääne-Saare Parish Lääne-Saare vald
- Former municipality of Estonia
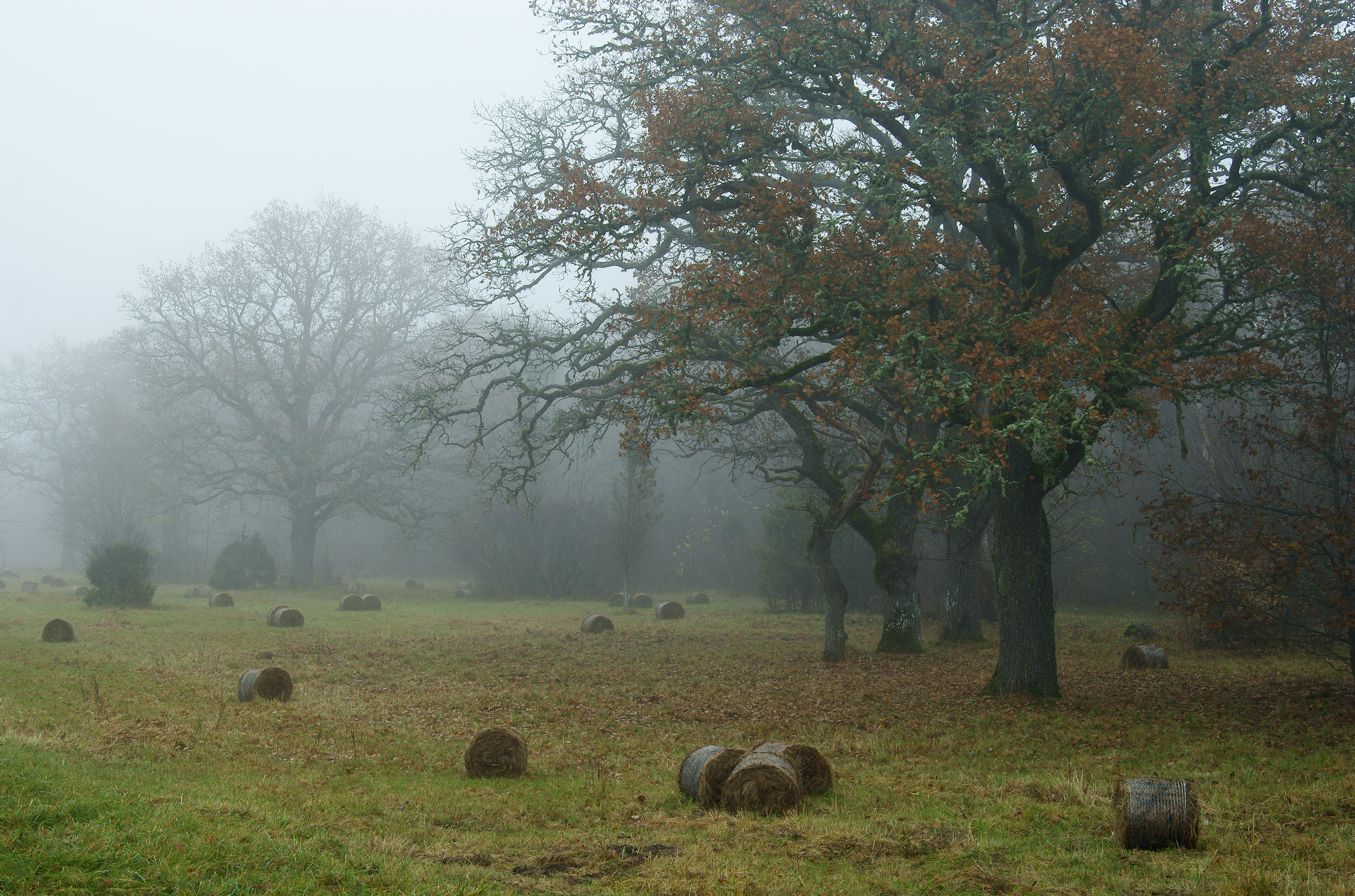

- Flag Coat of arms

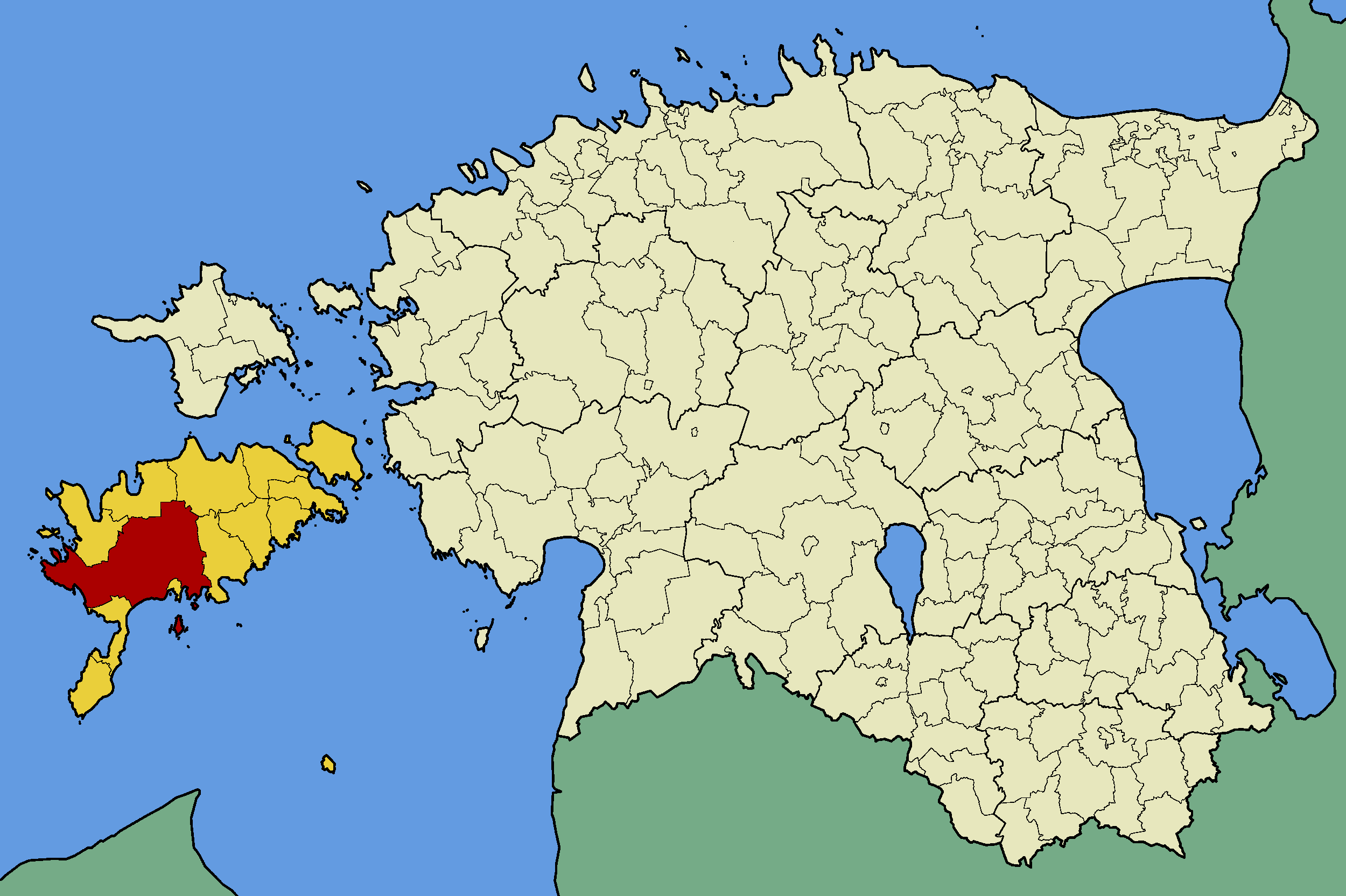
- Lääne-Saare Parish within Saare County.
- Country: Estonia
- County: Saare County
- Administrative centre: Kuressaare

Area
  - Total: 807 km^{2} (312 sq mi)

Population (2014)
  - Total: 7,200
  - Density: 8.9/km^{2} (23/sq mi)
- Website: www.laanesaare.ee

Lääne-Saare Parish (Estonian: Lääne-Saare vald) was a rural municipality of Estonia, in Saare County. It was located on the western part of Saaremaa island. The municipality has a population of ca 7,200 and an area of 807 km^{2}.

Lääne-Saare Parish was established by merging Kaarma, Kärla and Lümanda parishes on 12 December 2014.

During the administrative-territorial reform in 2017, all 12 municipalities on the island Saaremaa were merged into a single municipality – Saaremaa Parish.

== Populated places ==
Lääne-Saare Parish had 4 small boroughs (alevik): Aste, Kudjape, Kärla and Nasva; and 111 villages.

Villages

Abruka - Anepesa - Anijala - Ansi - Arandi - Aste - Asuküla - Atla - Aula-Vintri - Austla - Eeriksaare - Eikla - Endla - Haamse - Hakjala - Himmiste - Hirmuste - Hübja - Irase - Jõe - Jõempa - Jõgela - Jootme - Kaarma - Kaarma-Kirikuküla - Kaarmise - Käesla - Kaisvere - Käku - Kandla - Karala - Kärdu - Karida - Kärla-Kirikuküla - Kärla-Kulli - Kasti - Kaubi - Kellamäe - Keskranna - Keskvere - Kipi - Kiratsi - Kogula - Koidu - Koidula - Koimla - Koki - Koovi - Kõrkküla - Kotlandi - Kuke - Kungla - Kuuse - Kuusnõmme - Laadjala - Laheküla - Laoküla - Leedri - Lilbi - Lümanda - Lümanda-Kulli - Maleva - Mändjala - Mätasselja - Meedla - Metsaküla - Metsapere - Mõisaküla - Mõnnuste - Mullutu - Muratsi - Nõmme - Nõmpa - Õha - Paevere - Pähkla - Paiküla - Paimala - Parila - Pärni - Piila - Põlluküla - Praakli - Randvere - Riksu - Saia - Sauvere - Sepa - Sikassaare - Sõmera - Tahula - Tamsalu - Taritu - Tõlli - Tõrise - Tõru - Uduvere - Ulje - Unimäe - Upa - Vahva - Vaivere - Vana-Lahetaguse - Vantri - Varpe - Vatsküla - Vendise - Vennati - Vestla - Viidu - Viira
