= Kellamäe, Saare County =

Village in Estonia

Coordinates: 58°19′33″N 22°26′11″E

Kellamäe
- Village
- Interactive map of Kellamäe
- Country: Estonia
- County: Saare County
- Parish: Saaremaa Parish
- Time zone: UTC+2 (EET)
  - Summer (DST): UTC+3 (EEST)

Kellamäe is a village in Saaremaa Parish, Saare County in western Estonia.

Before the administrative reform in 2017, the village was in Lääne-Saare Parish.
