= Paimala =

Village in Estonia

Coordinates: 58°16′52″N 22°35′23″E

- Village
- Interactive map of Paimala
- Country: Estonia
- County: Saare County
- Parish: Saaremaa Parish
- Time zone: UTC+2 (EET)
  - Summer (DST): UTC+3 (EEST)

Paimala is a village in Saaremaa Parish, Saare County in western Estonia.

Before the administrative reform in 2017, the village was in Lääne-Saare Parish.
