= Koki, Estonia =

Village in Estonia

Coordinates: 58°14′N 22°05′E

Koki
- Village
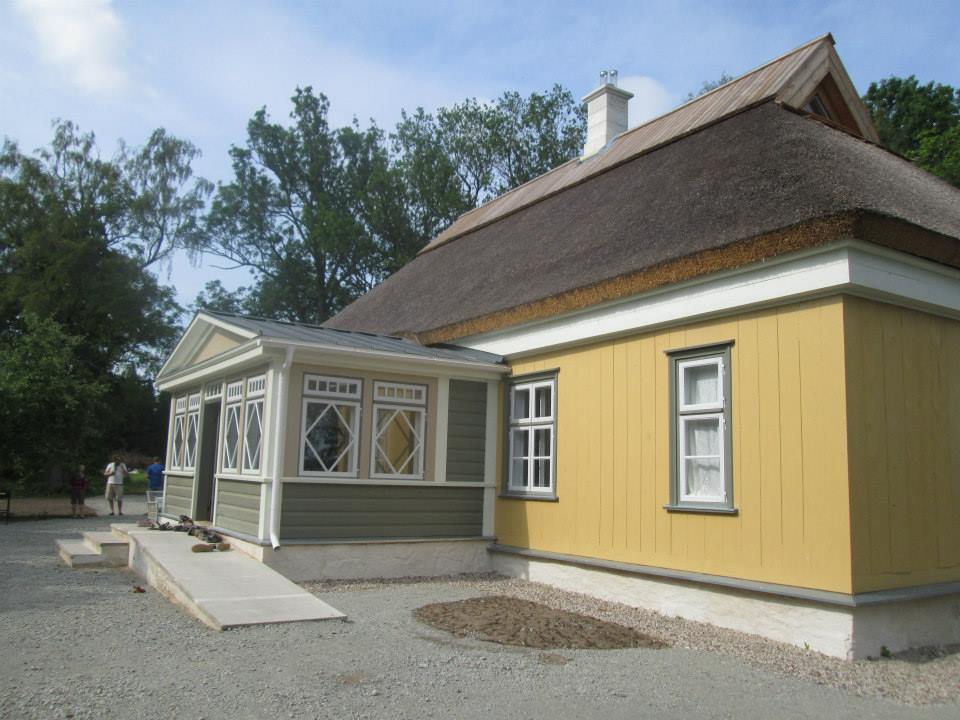
- a building in Koli, constructed 1818
- Interactive map of Koki
- Country: Estonia
- County: Saare County
- Parish: Saaremaa Parish
- Time zone: UTC+2 (EET)
  - Summer (DST): UTC+3 (EEST)

Koki is a village in Saaremaa Parish, Saare County in western Estonia.

Before the administrative reform in 2017, the village was in Lääne-Saare Parish.
