= Himmiste =

Village in Estonia

- Village
- Location within Estonia
- Coordinates: 58°16′18″N 21°58′25″E
- Country: Estonia
- County: Saare County
- Parish: Saaremaa Parish
- Time zone: UTC+2 (EET)
  - Summer (DST): UTC+3 (EEST)

Himmiste is a village in Saaremaa Parish, Saare County, Estonia.

Before the administrative reform in 2017, the village was in Lääne-Saare Parish.
