= Kuusnõmme =

Village in Estonia

Coordinates: 58°19′N 21°59′E

- Village
- Interactive map of Kuusnõmme
- Country: Estonia
- County: Saare County
- Municipality: Saaremaa Parish
- Time zone: UTC+2 (EET)
  - Summer (DST): UTC+3 (EEST)

Kuusnõmme is a village in Saaremaa Parish, Saare County in western Estonia.

Before the administrative reform in 2017, the village was in Lääne-Saare Parish.
