= Mändjala =

Village in Estonia

- Village
- Location in Estonia
- Coordinates: 58°13′26″N 22°20′48″E
- Country: Estonia
- County: Saare County
- Municipality: Saaremaa Parish

Population (2011 Census)
  - Total: 161

Mändjala is a village in Saaremaa Parish, Saare County, Estonia, on the island of Saaremaa.

It is located about 8 km (5 mi) southwest of Kuressaare, on the northern coast of the bay of Suur Katel (part of the Gulf of Riga). As of the 2011 census, the settlement's population was 161. According to TripAdvisor, there are 3 hotels in Mändjala (the Saaremaa Hotell, Ferienhaus Toikka and Leppaneni) and there are 15 hotels in the Kuressaare area close to Mändjala.

Before the administrative reform in 2017, the village was in Lääne-Saare Parish.
