= Saia, Estonia =

Village in Estonia

Coordinates: 58°20′N 22°28′E

Saia
- Village
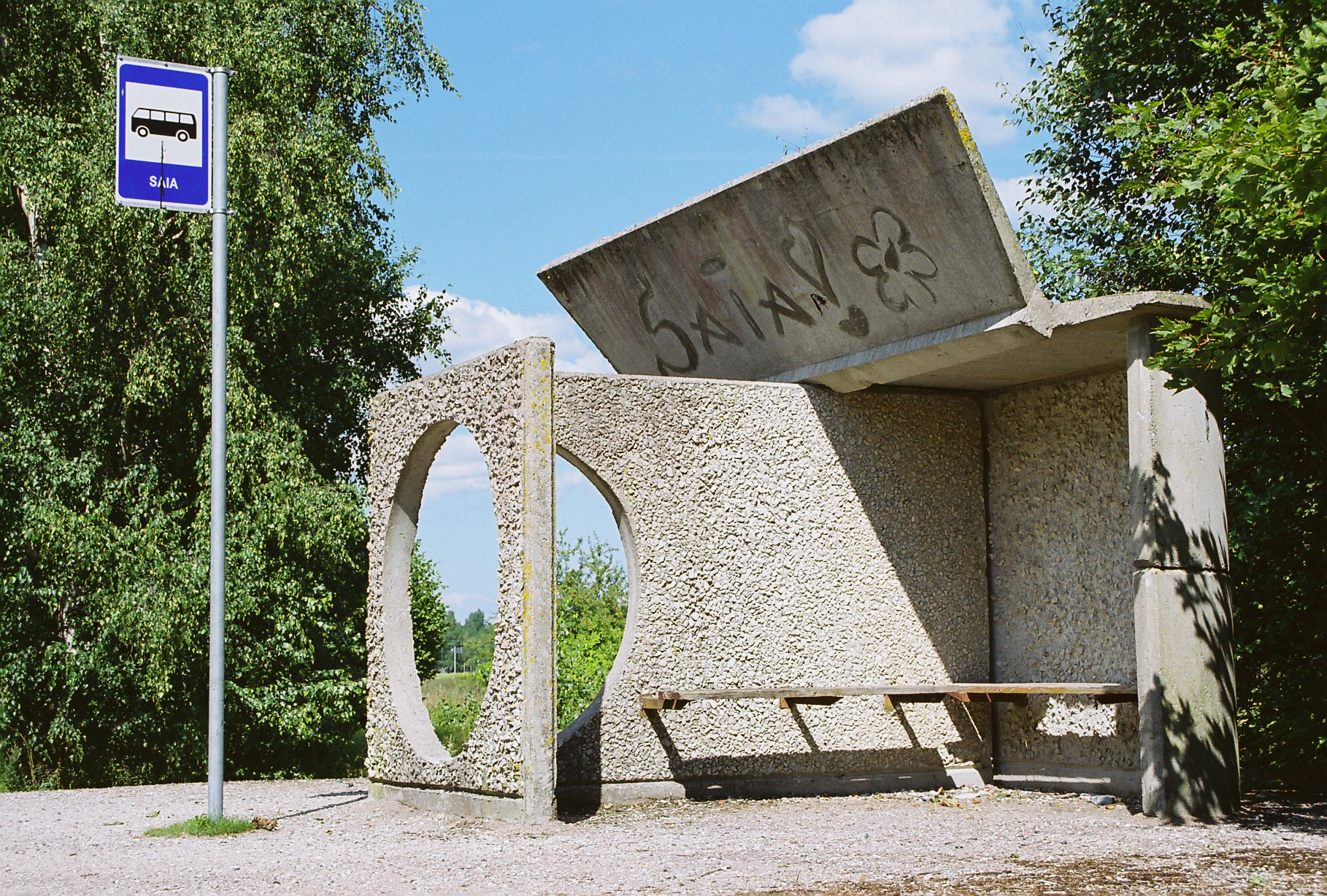
- Interactive map of Saia
- Country: Estonia
- County: Saare
- Parish: Saaremaa
- Time zone: UTC+2 (EET)
  - Summer (DST): UTC+3 (EEST)

Saia is a village in Saaremaa Parish, Saare County in western Estonia.

Before the administrative reform in 2017, the village was in Lääne-Saare Parish.
