= Käku =

Village in Estonia

- village
- Location in Estonia
- Coordinates: 58°21′49″N 22°29′12″E
- Country: Estonia
- County: Saare County
- Municipality: Saaremaa Parish

Population (01.01.2011)
  - Total: 37

Käku is a village in Saaremaa Parish, Saare County, Estonia, on the island of Saaremaa.

Before the administrative reform in 2017, the village was in Lääne-Saare Parish.

It has a population of 37 (as of 1 January 2011).

One of two Saaremaa Motoklubi's motocross circuits is located in Käku.
