= Kogula, Saaremaa Parish =

Village in Estonia

Coordinates: 58°17′N 22°17′E

Kogula, Kärla Parish
- Village
- Interactive map of Kogula, Kärla Parish
- Country: Estonia
- County: Saare County
- Parish: Saaremaa Parish
- Time zone: UTC+2 (EET)
  - Summer (DST): UTC+3 (EEST)

Kogula is a village in Saaremaa Parish, Saare County in western Estonia.

Before the administrative reform in 2017, the village was in Lääne-Saare Parish.

Mullutu Bay, the western part of Estonian fourth largest lake Mullutu-Suurlaht, is partially located in the southeastern end of the territory of Kogula village.
