= Kaarmise =

Village in Estonia

Coordinates: 58°20′N 22°22′E

- Village
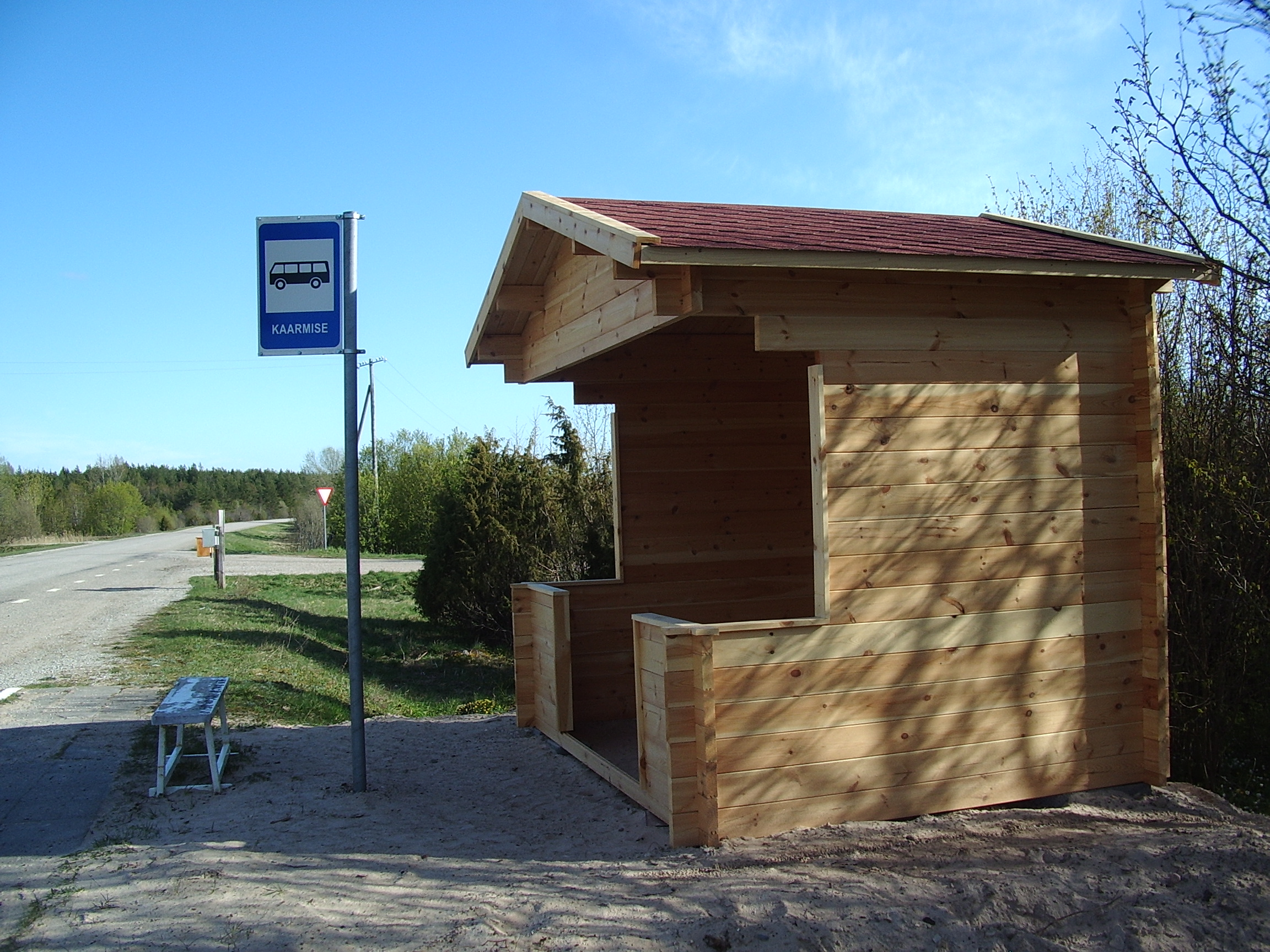
- Bus stop in Kaarmise
- Interactive map of Kaarmise
- Country: Estonia
- County: Saare County
- Parish: Saaremaa Parish
- Time zone: UTC+2 (EET)
  - Summer (DST): UTC+3 (EEST)

Kaarmise is a village in Saaremaa Parish, Saare County in western part of Estonia.

The native language is Estonian.

Before the administrative reform in 2017, the village was in Lääne-Saare Parish.
