= Tahula =

Village in Estonia

Coordinates: 58°18′N 22°35′E

- Village
- Interactive map of Tahula
- Country: Estonia
- County: Saare County
- Parish: Saaremaa Parish

Population (2021)
  - Total: 86
- Time zone: UTC+2 (EET)
  - Summer (DST): UTC+3 (EEST)

Tahula is a village in Saaremaa Parish, Saare County in western Estonia.

Before the administrative reform in 2017, the village was in Lääne-Saare Parish.

As of 2021 the population for the village is 86.
