= Eeriksaare =

Village in Estonia

Coordinates: 58°19′N 21°55′E

- Village
- Interactive map of Eeriksaare
- Country: Estonia
- County: Saare County
- Parish: Saaremaa Parish

Government
  - Mayor: Taavi Tukosen

Area
  - Total: 0.31 km^{2} (0.12 sq mi)

Population (2022)
  - Total: 27
  - Density: 87/km^{2} (230/sq mi)
- Time zone: UTC+2 (EET)
  - Summer (DST): UTC+3 (EEST)
- Area code: +372

Eeriksaare is a village in Saaremaa Parish, Saare County in western Estonia. Before the administrative reform in 2017, the village was in Lääne-Saare Parish. It is located on the island Saaremaa, and is situated 35.2 km (21.8 mi) away from Kuressaare and 241 km (150 mi) away from Tallinn.

The village was nominated as one of Estonia's prettiest villages in 2017. A one-lane gravel road connects Eeriksaare to the Käesla-Karala-Loona road.

== Population ==
Year	1982	1992	2002	2012	2022
Population	39	31	32	26	27
Percentage change	—	-25.8%	+3.1%	-23.1%	+3.7%
