= Sauvere =

Village in Estonia

- Village
- Location within Estonia
- Coordinates: 58°23′N 22°20′E
- Country: Estonia
- County: Saare County
- Parish: Saaremaa Parish
- Time zone: UTC+2 (EET)
  - Summer (DST): UTC+3 (EEST)

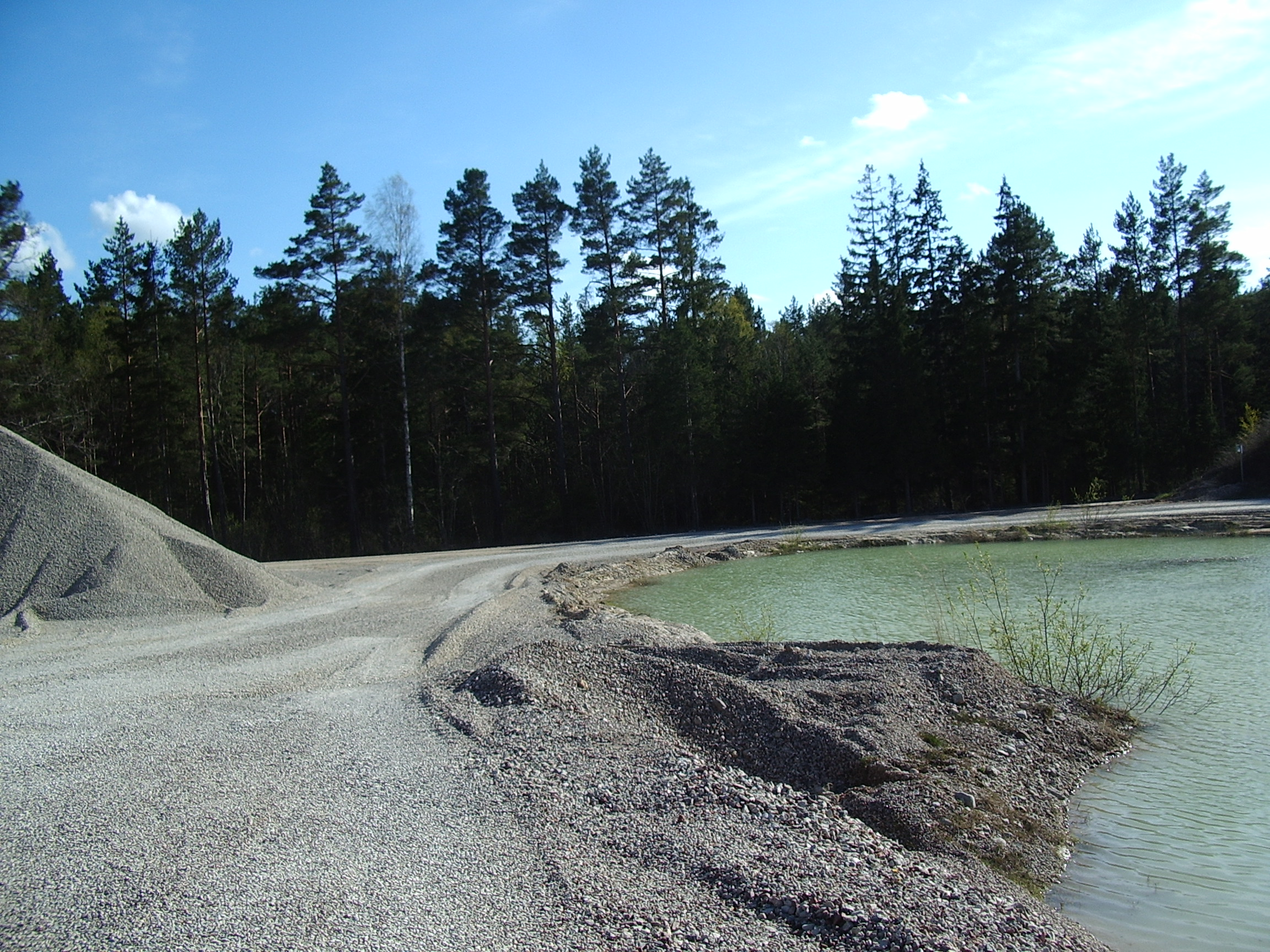
Sauvere gravel quarry

Sauvere is a village in Saaremaa Parish in Saare County in western Estonia.

As of 1 January 2007, Sauvere has a population of 68.

Before the administrative reform in 2017, the village was in Lääne-Saare Parish.
