= Kihelkonna Parish =

Former municipality of Estonia

Coordinates: 58°21′08″N 22°02′49″E

Kihelkonna Parish Kihelkonna vald
- Municipality of Estonia
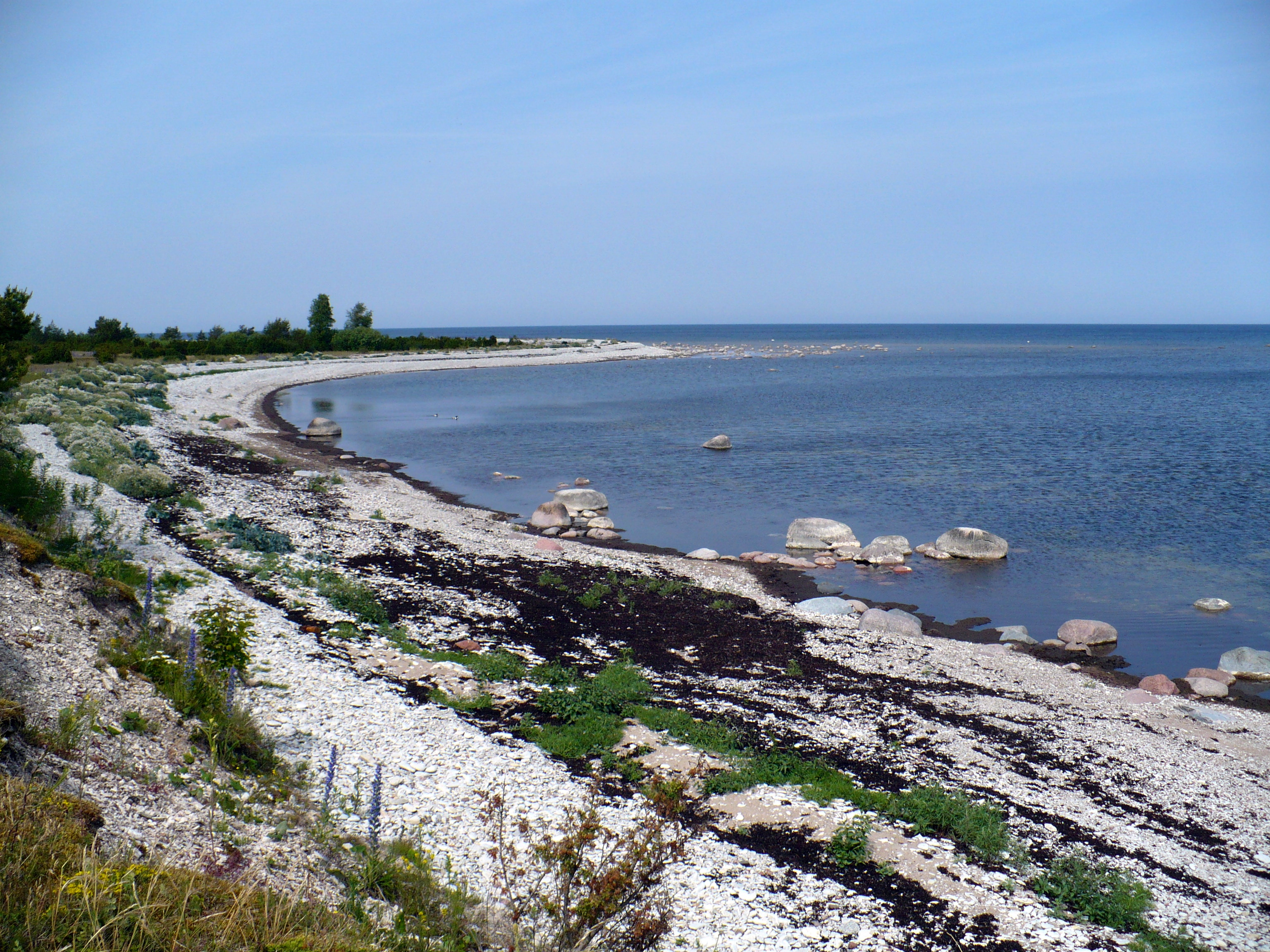

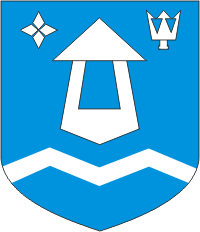
- Flag Coat of arms

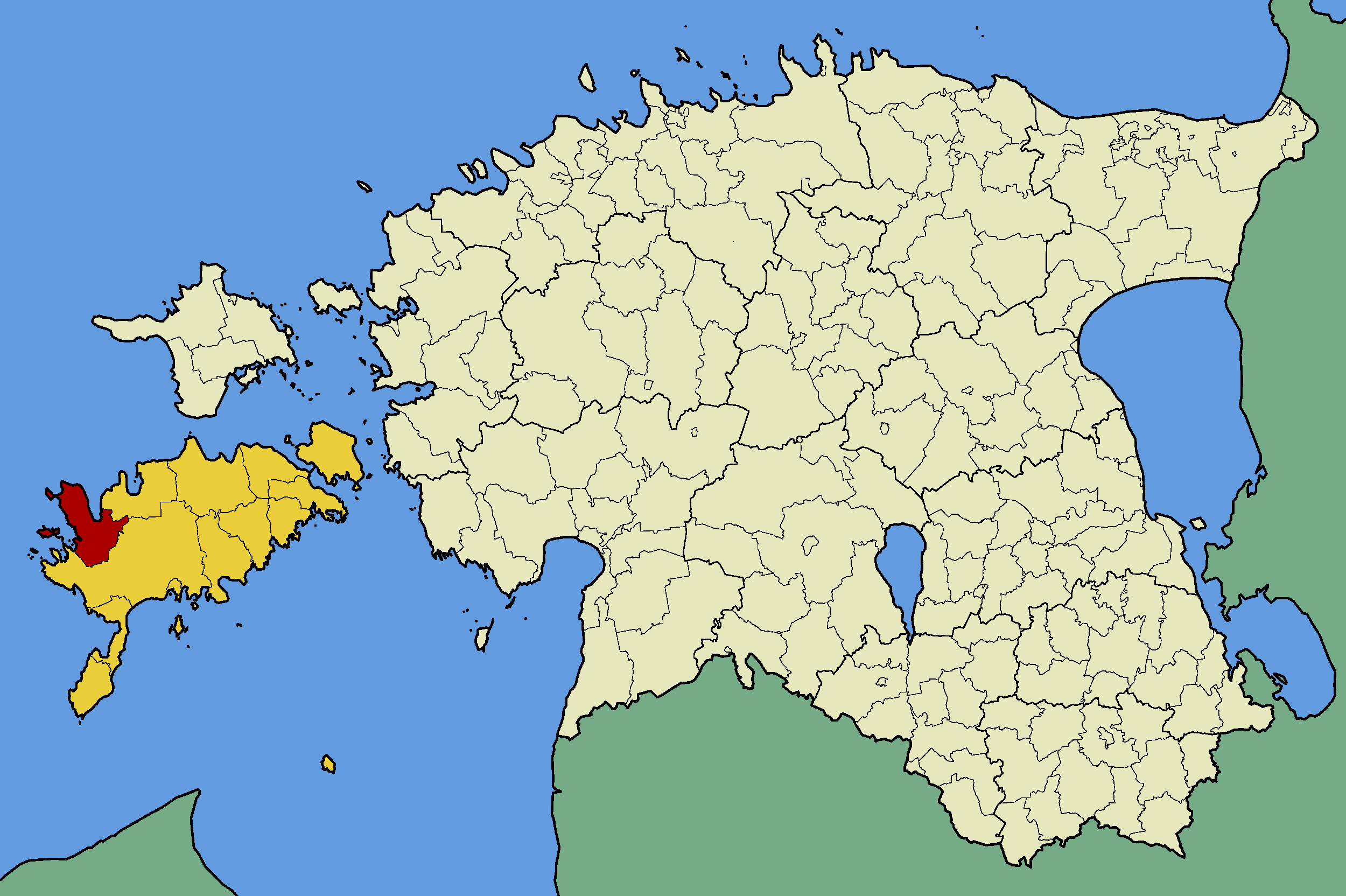
- Kihelkonna Parish within Saare County.
- Country: Estonia
- County: Saare County
- Administrative centre: Kihelkonna

Government
  - Mayor: Raimu Aardam

Area
  - Total: 245.94 km^{2} (94.96 sq mi)

Population (01.01.2016)
  - Total: 750
  - Density: 3.0/km^{2} (7.9/sq mi)
- Website: www.kihelkonna.ee

Kihelkonna Parish was a municipality in Saare County, Estonia.

The parish included the islands of Aherahu, Juksirahu, Kalarahu, Käkirahu, Laasirahu, Loonalaid, Maturahu, Mihklirahu, Noogimaa, Nootamaa, Ojurahu, Salava, Uus-Nootamaa, Vaika islands, Vesiloo, and Vilsandi, and the peninsula (formerly an island) of Harilaid.

The municipality has a population of 891 (as of 1 January 2006) and covers an area of 245.94 km^{2}.

During the administrative-territorial reform in 2017, all 12 municipalities on the island of Saaremaa were merged into a single municipality – Saaremaa Parish.

== Settlements ==
Small borough

Kihelkonna

Villages

Abaja - Abula - Kallaste - Kalmu - Karujärve - Kehila - Kiirassaare - Kõõru - Kõruse - Kotsma - Kuralase - Kuremetsa - Kurevere - Kuumi - Kuusiku - Läägi - Lätiniidi - Liiva - Loona - Mäebe - Metsaküla - Neeme - Odalätsi - Oju - Pajumõisa - Pidula - Rannaküla - Rootsiküla - Sepise - Tagamõisa - Tammese - Tohku - Undva - Üru - Vaigu - Varkja - Vedruka - Veere - Viki - Vilsandi - Virita

== See also ==
- Municipalities of Estonia
- List of municipalities of Estonia
