= Teesu Nature Reserve =

Protected area in Estonia

- Location within Estonia
- Location: Estonia
- Coordinates: 58°25′N 22°05′E
- Area: 153 ha (380 acres)
- Established: 2007

Teesu Nature Reserve is a nature reserve which is located in Saare County, Estonia.

The area of the nature reserve is 153 ha.

The protected area was founded in 2007 to protect valuable habitat types and threatened species in Kallaste and Kehila village (both in former Kihelkonna Parish).
