= Harilaid =

Harilaid may refer to:

- Harilaid (peninsula), peninsula in Estonia
- Harilaid (islet), small uninhabited island in Estonia
- Mihkel Harilaid (born 1966), Canadian film producer of Estonian origin
