= Kõruse-Metsaküla =

Village in Estonia

Coordinates: 58°28′43″N 21°56′05″E

- Village
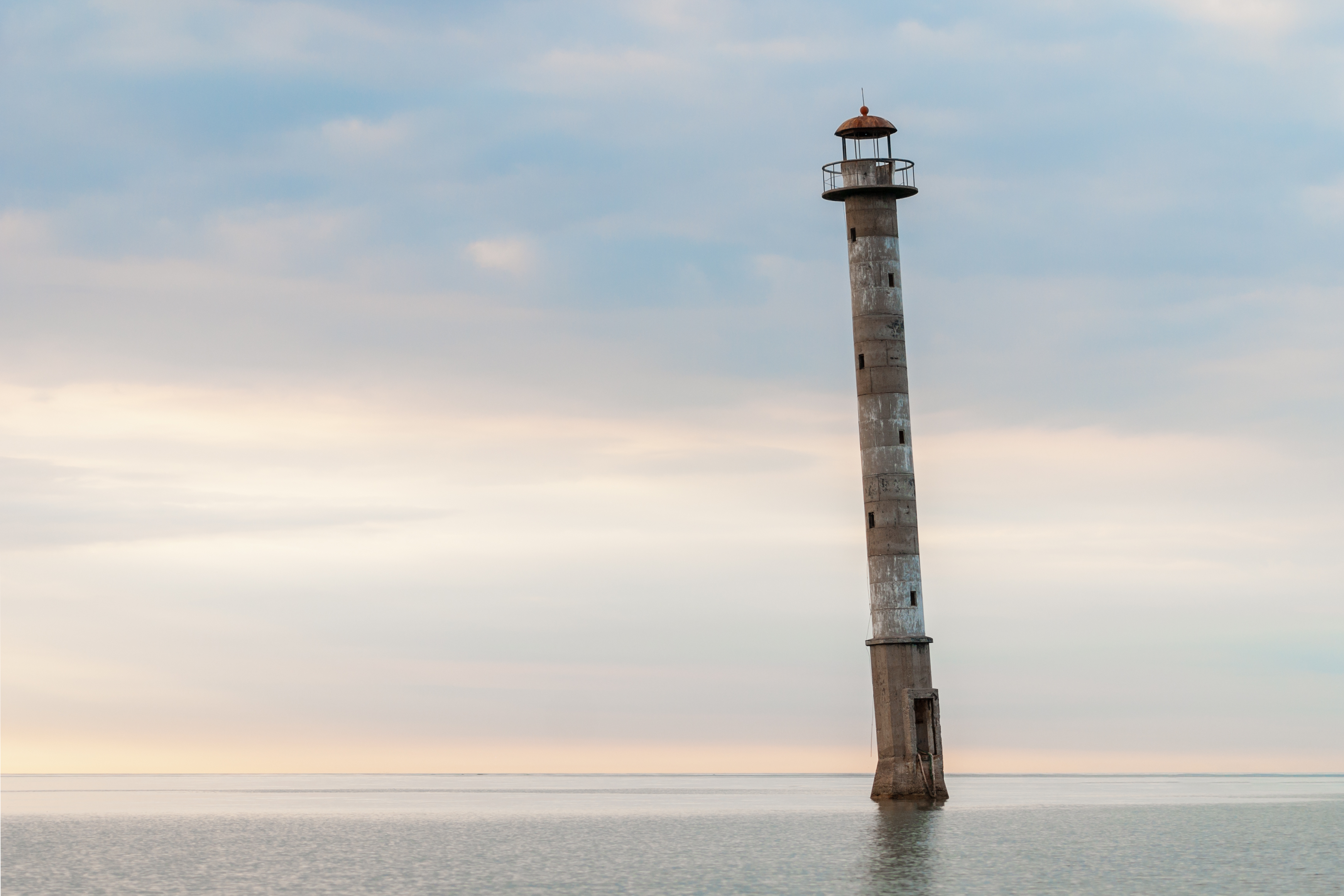
- Kiipsaare leaning lighthouse in Metsaküla
- Interactive map of Kõruse-Metsaküla
- Country: Estonia
- County: Saare County
- Parish: Saaremaa Parish
- Time zone: UTC+2 (EET)
  - Summer (DST): UTC+3 (EEST)

Kõruse-Metsaküla (Metsaküla until 2017) is a village in Saaremaa Parish, Saare County in western Estonia.

Before the administrative reform in 2017, the village was in Kihelkonna Parish.

Harilaid peninsula and Kiipsaare Lighthouse are located in the eastern part of the village territory.
