= Loona, Estonia =

Village in Estonia

Coordinates: 58°20′04″N 22°00′56″E

- Village
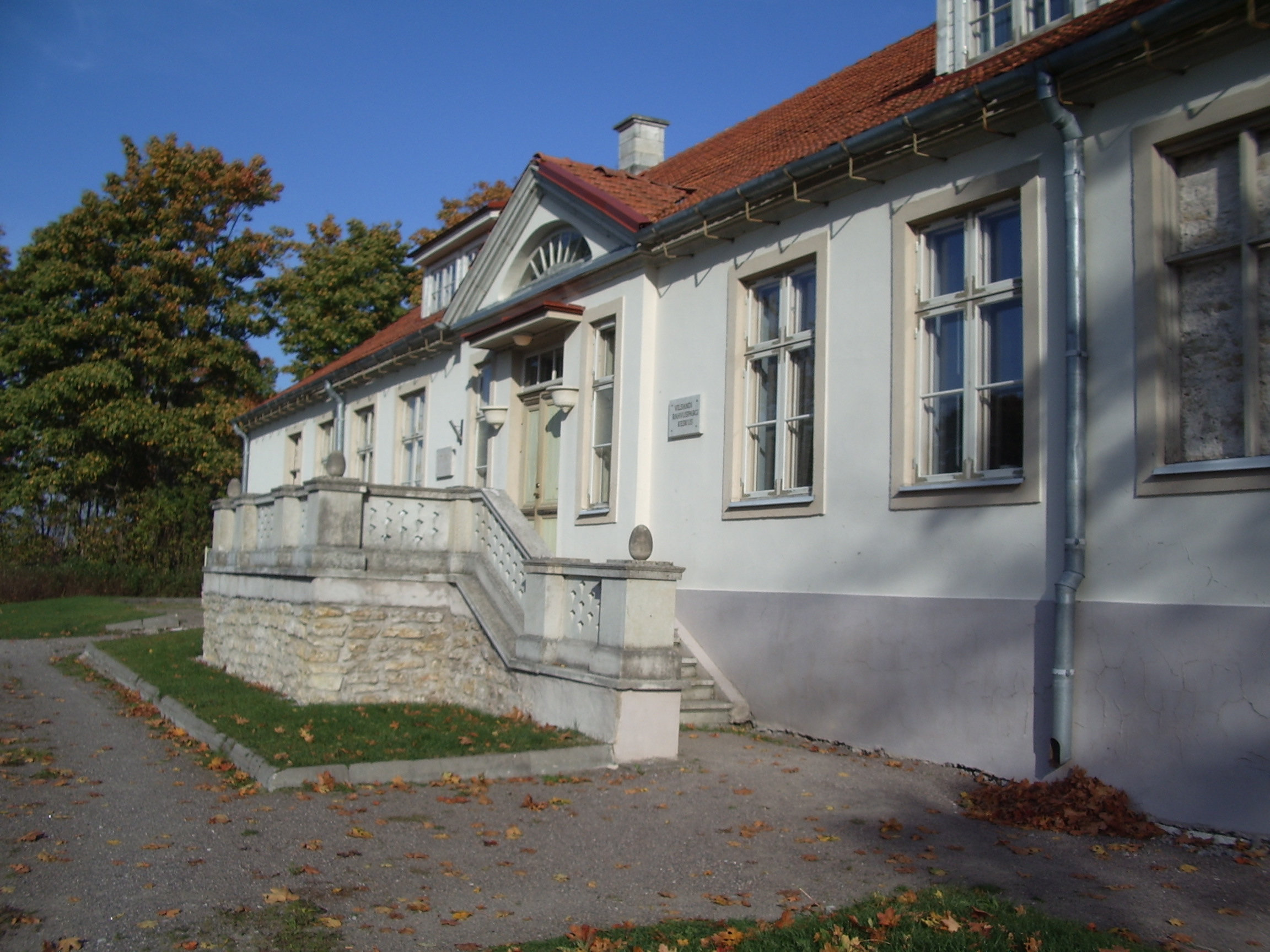
- Loona Manor
- Interactive map of Loona, Estonia
- Country: Estonia
- County: Saare County
- Parish: Saaremaa Parish
- Time zone: UTC+2 (EET)
  - Summer (DST): UTC+3 (EEST)

Loona is a village in Saaremaa Parish, Saare County in western Estonia.

Before the administrative reform in 2017, the village was in Kihelkonna Parish.

== Loona Manor ==
An estate has existed at this location at least since 1480 and the original building was a fortified manor house. This so-called "vassal castle" was destroyed at the beginning of the 17th century (Purtse Castle in eastern Estonia is a surviving example of the same type of building). The present building dates from 1785 and has been rebuilt at different times since then. During the Soviet occupation of Estonia, the building fell into disrepair. It was renovated in 1997.

The manor is situated in Vilsandi National Park.

== See also ==
- Vilsandi National Park
- List of palaces and manor houses in Estonia
