= Oju =

Oju may refer to:

- Oju, Estonia, a village in Saare County
- Oju, Nigeria, a local government area in Benue State
- Oju, the art name of Yi Gyu-gyeong, Joseon Silhak scholar
- OJU is the abbreviation of the Oceanic Judo Union
