= Koerakuiv =

Island in Estonia

Coordinates: 58°18′50.81″N 21°49′57.83″E

Koerakuiv is a small islet in the Baltic Sea belonging to the country of Estonia. Koerakuiv lies just off the northwest coast of the island of Saaremaa, and is administratively part of Atla village in Saaremaa Parish, Saare County and is also part of Vilsandi National Park.

== See also ==
- List of islands of Estonia
