= Urverahu =

Island in Estonia

Coordinates: 58.3097°N 21.9028°E

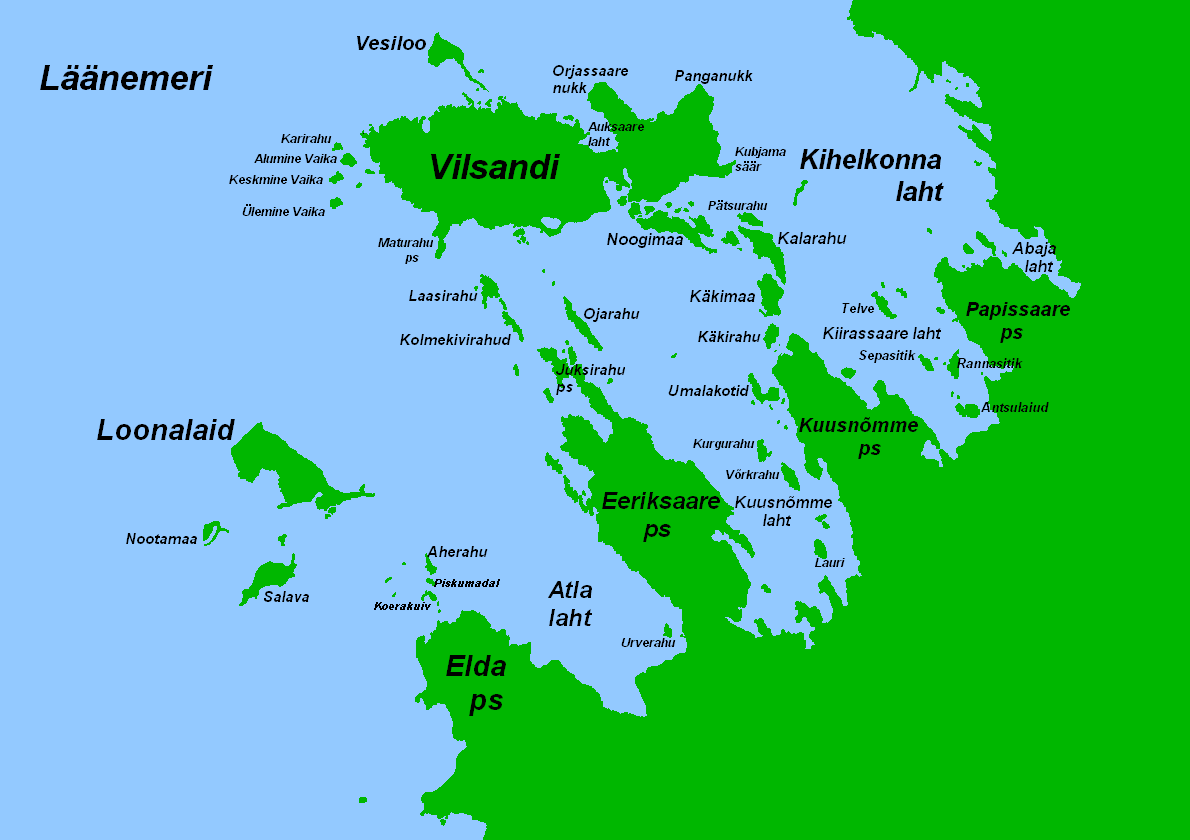
Map showing Urverahu and surrounding islands

Urverahu is a small uninhabited islet in the Baltic Sea belonging to the country of Estonia.

Urverahu lies just off the west coast of the island of Saaremaa, and is administratively part of Atla village in Saaremaa Parish, Saare County and is also part of Vilsandi National Park.

== See also ==
- List of islands of Estonia
