= Mäebe =

Mäebe may refer to several places in Estonia:

- Mäebe, Saare County, village in Estonia
- Mäebe, former name of Viidu-Mäebe village, Saare County, village in Estonia
