= Innarahu =

Island in Estonia

Coordinates: 58°16′47″N 21°49′28″E

Innarahu is a small, uninhabited Baltic Sea islet belonging to Estonia.

Innarahu is a protected island belonging to Vilsandi National Park, off the western coast of the larger island of Saaremaa.

The island is administratively part of Atla village in Saaremaa Parish, Saare County.

The island is a calving ground for Baltic grey seals (Halichoerus grypus).
