= Karujärve =

Village in Estonia

Coordinates: 58°23′N 22°13′E

- Village
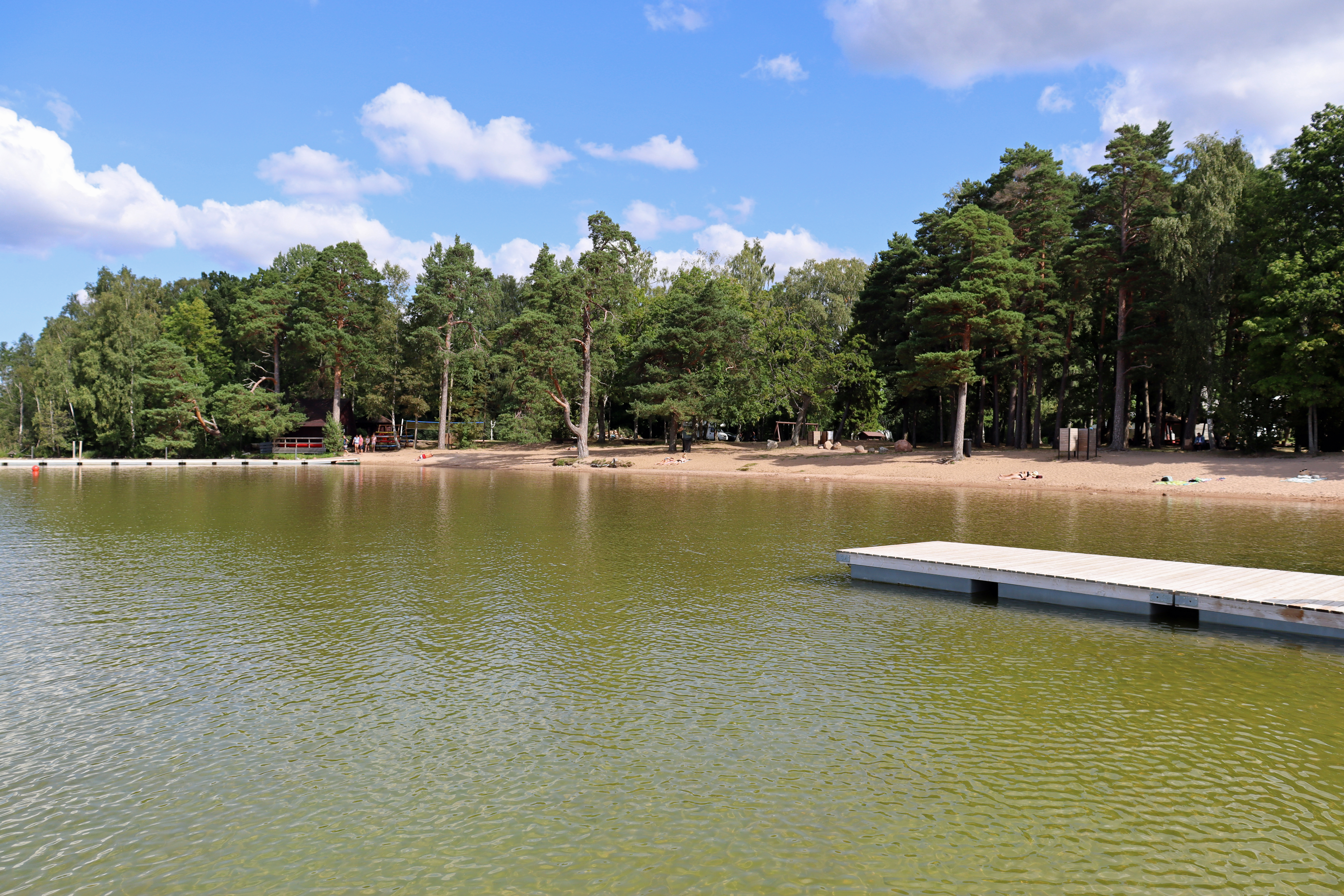
- Karujärve lake beach
- Interactive map of Karujärve
- Country: Estonia
- County: Saare County
- Parish: Saaremaa Parish
- Time zone: UTC+2 (EET)
  - Summer (DST): UTC+3 (EEST)

Karujärve is a village in Saaremaa Parish, Saare County in western Estonia.

Before the administrative reform in 2017, the village was in Kihelkonna Parish.
