= Atla, Saare County =

Village in Estonia

Atla
- Village
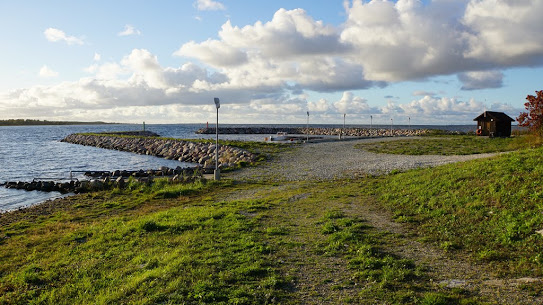
- Beach at Atla

- Location within Estonia
- Coordinates: 58°17′55″N 21°54′10″E
- Country: Estonia
- County: Saare County
- Parish: Saaremaa Parish
- Time zone: UTC+2 (EET)
  - Summer (DST): UTC+3 (EEST)

Atla is a village in Saaremaa Parish, Saare County in western Estonia. It is the westernmost settlement of Estonia.

Before the administrative reform in 2017, the village was in Lääne-Saare Parish.

The islets of Loonalaid, Salavamaa, Nootamaa, Aherahu, Koerakuiv, Püskumadal, Urverahu and Innarahu administratively belong to Atla village. The island of Nootamaa is also the westernmost point of Estonia.
