= Nootamaa =

Island in Estonia

Coordinates: 58°19′20″N 21°45′51″E

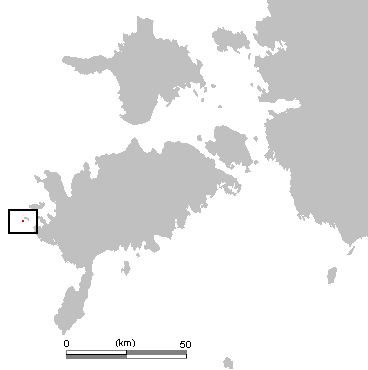
Location of Nootamaa

Nootamaa is a small, uninhabited island in the Baltic Sea belonging to the country of Estonia. It marks the westernmost part of Estonia's territorial boundary.

Nootamaa has an area of 59,000 sq metres and lies off the extreme western coast of the island of Saaremaa. Together with some other forty islands and islets, it makes up the Vilsandi National Park - an area of ecological protection for birds.

Nootamaa belongs administratively to the rural village of Atla in Saaremaa Parish, Saare County. The island is depicted on the Estonian two euro coin.

== See also ==
- List of islands of Estonia
