= Salavamaa =

Island in Estonia

Coordinates: 58°19′N 21°48′E

Salavamaa also known as Salava is a small island in the Baltic Sea belonging to the country of Estonia. Salavamaa lies just off the northwest coast of the island of Saaremaa, and is administratively part of Atla village in Saaremaa Parish, Saare County and is also part of Vilsandi National Park.

== See also ==
List of islands of Estonia
