= Kiipsaare Lighthouse =

Lighthouse in Estonia

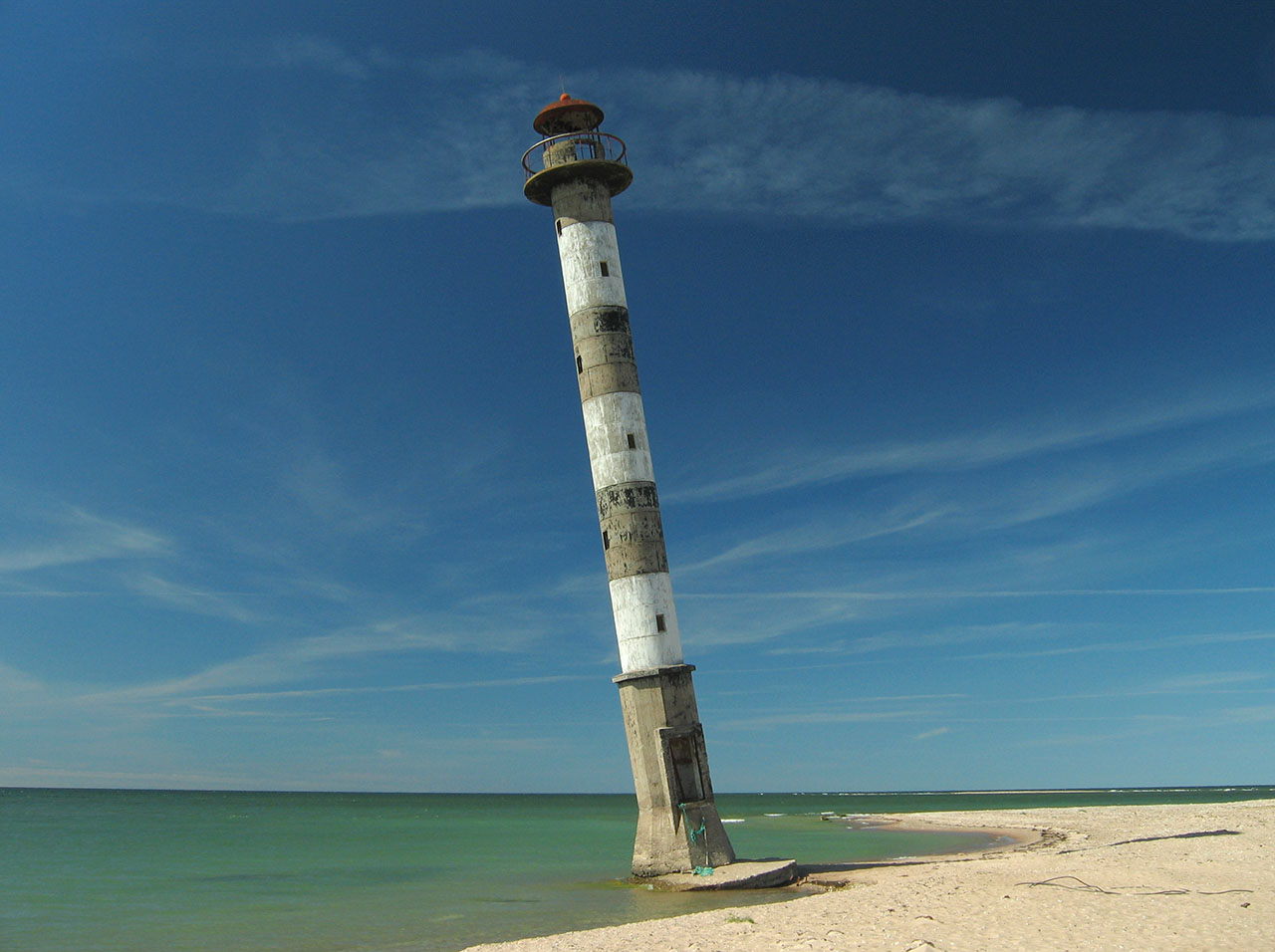
- The lighthouse in 2006
- Location: Saaremaa, Harilaid, Saaremaa Parish, Estonia
- Coordinates: 58°29′45″N 21°50′28″E

Tower
- Constructed: 1933
- Construction: concrete (foundation), concrete (tower)
- Height: 25 m (82 ft)
- Shape: cylinder
- Markings: Stripe (black & white, horizontal orientation)

Light
- First lit: 1933
- Deactivated: 1992, 2009
- Focal height: 26 m (85 ft)
- Range: 15 nmi (28 km; 17 mi)
- Characteristic: Fl W 4s
- Estonia no.: EVA 921

Kiipsaare Lighthouse is located on the tip of the Harilaid peninsula on the island of Saaremaa, Estonia, in the territory of Vilsandi National Park.

The lighthouse was built from reinforced concrete in 1933. Its purpose was to warn mariners on the Baltic Sea about the dangers in the vicinity of the peninsula and to be of assistance in taking bearings. At that time the 25-metre-high (82 ft) lighthouse was 150 metres (490 ft) inland, but due to erosion it is now more than 50 metres (160 ft) offshore. A lack of supporting ground has caused the lighthouse to lean.

While in 1988 the waterline was still 11 metres (36 ft) from the lighthouse, by the early 1990s the sea had already reached the lighthouse and it started to incline. Because of this the generator was removed in 1992 and Kiipsaare Lighthouse remained in the records as a daymark until 2009.

The lighthouse played a prominent role in the 2003 Estonian film Somnambuul, set in autumn 1944 during World War II.

== Gallery ==
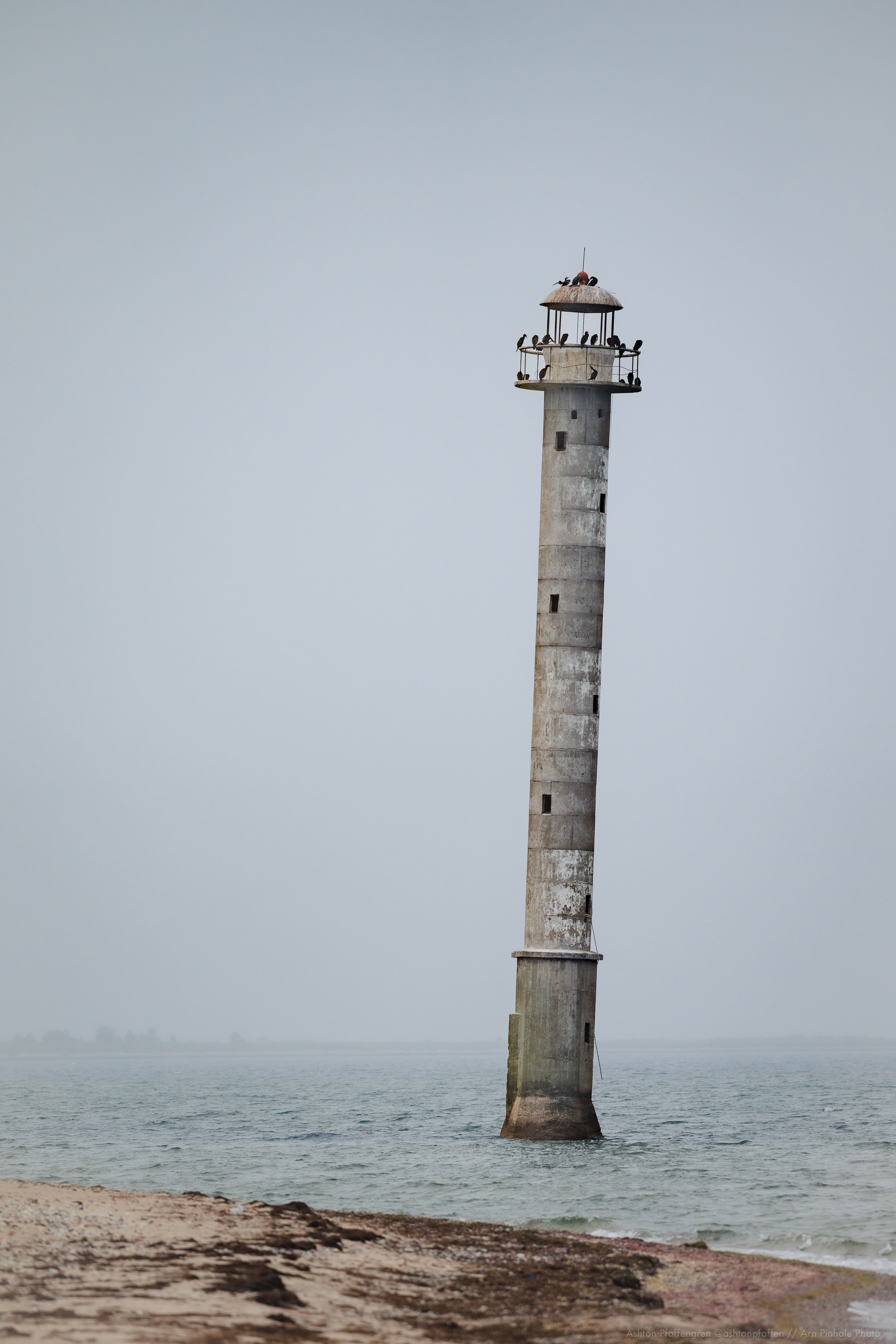
Kiipsaare Lighthouse, 2023

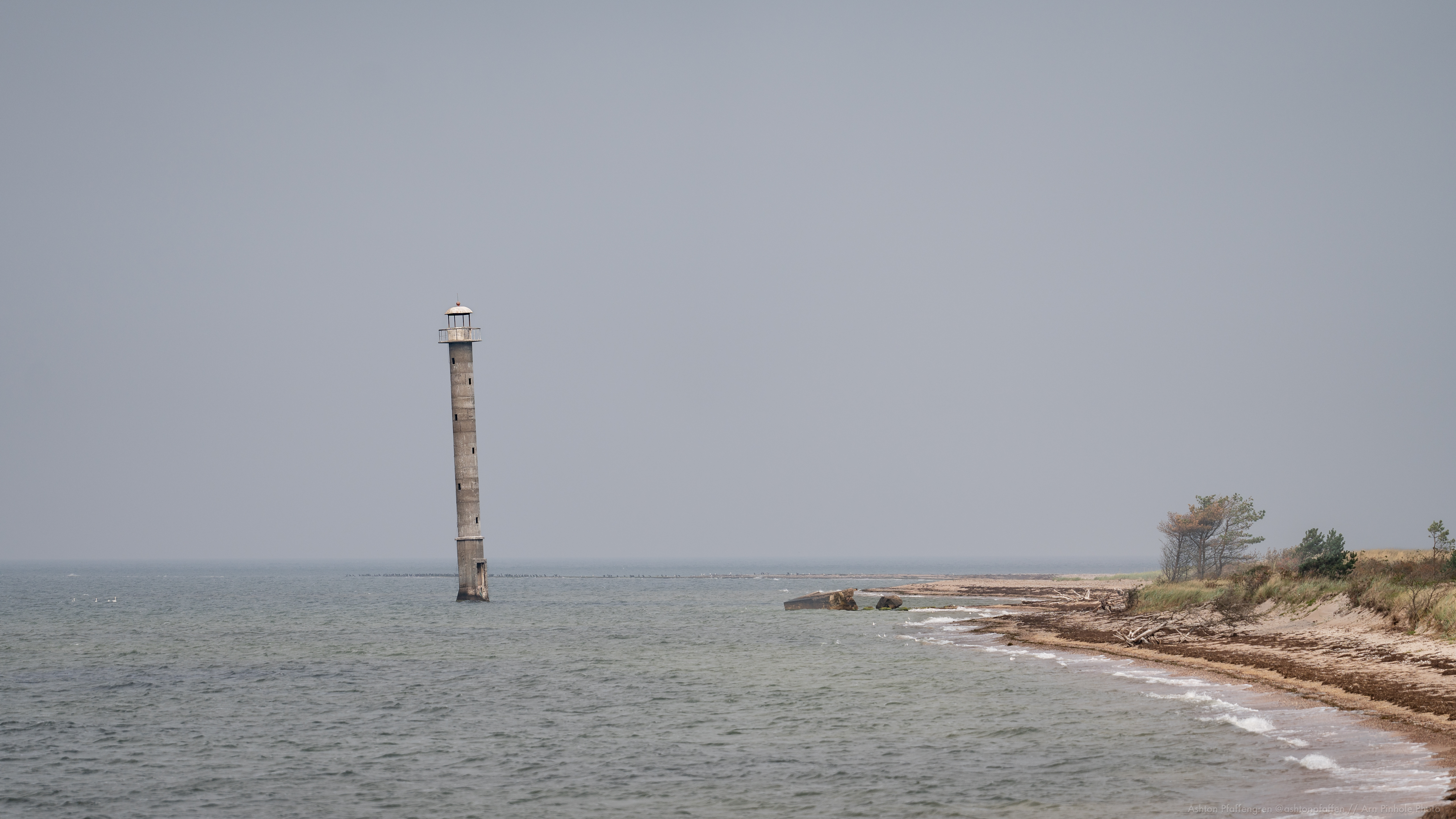
Kiipsaare Lighthouse seen from South with the tip of Kiipsaare Nukk visible in the background, 2023

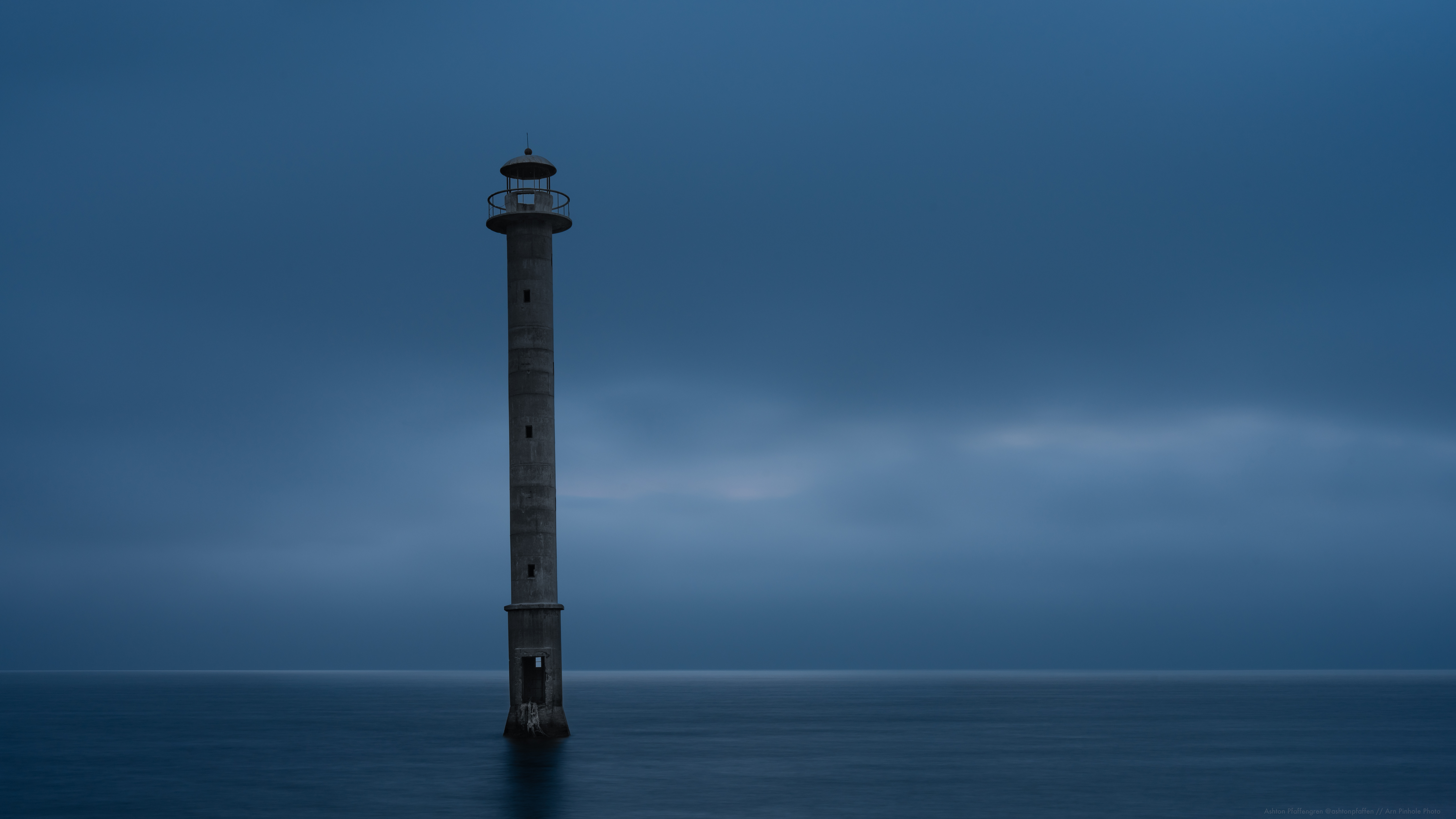
Long exposure of Kiipsaare Lighthouse by moonlight, 2023

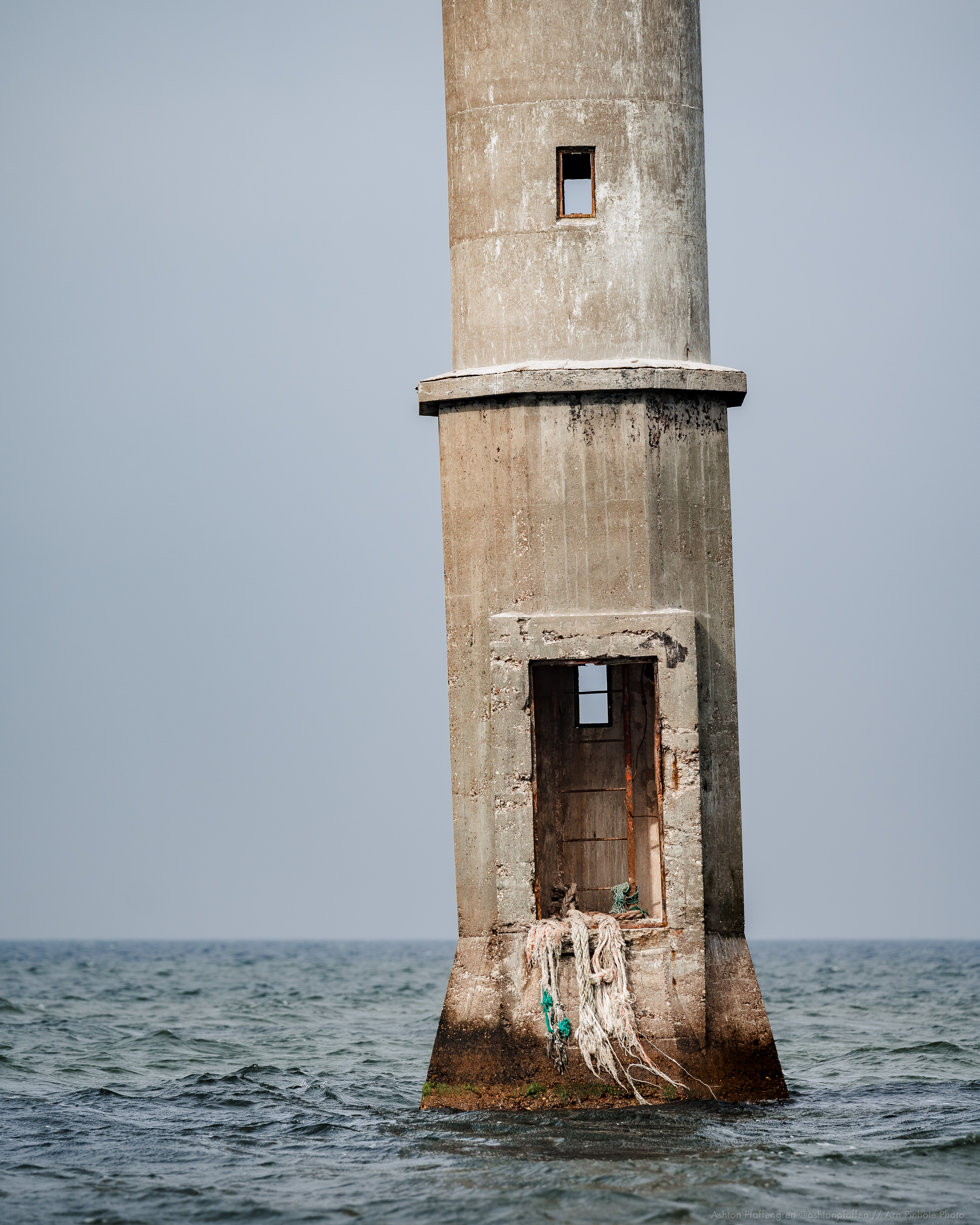
Base of Kiipsaare Lighthouse, 2023

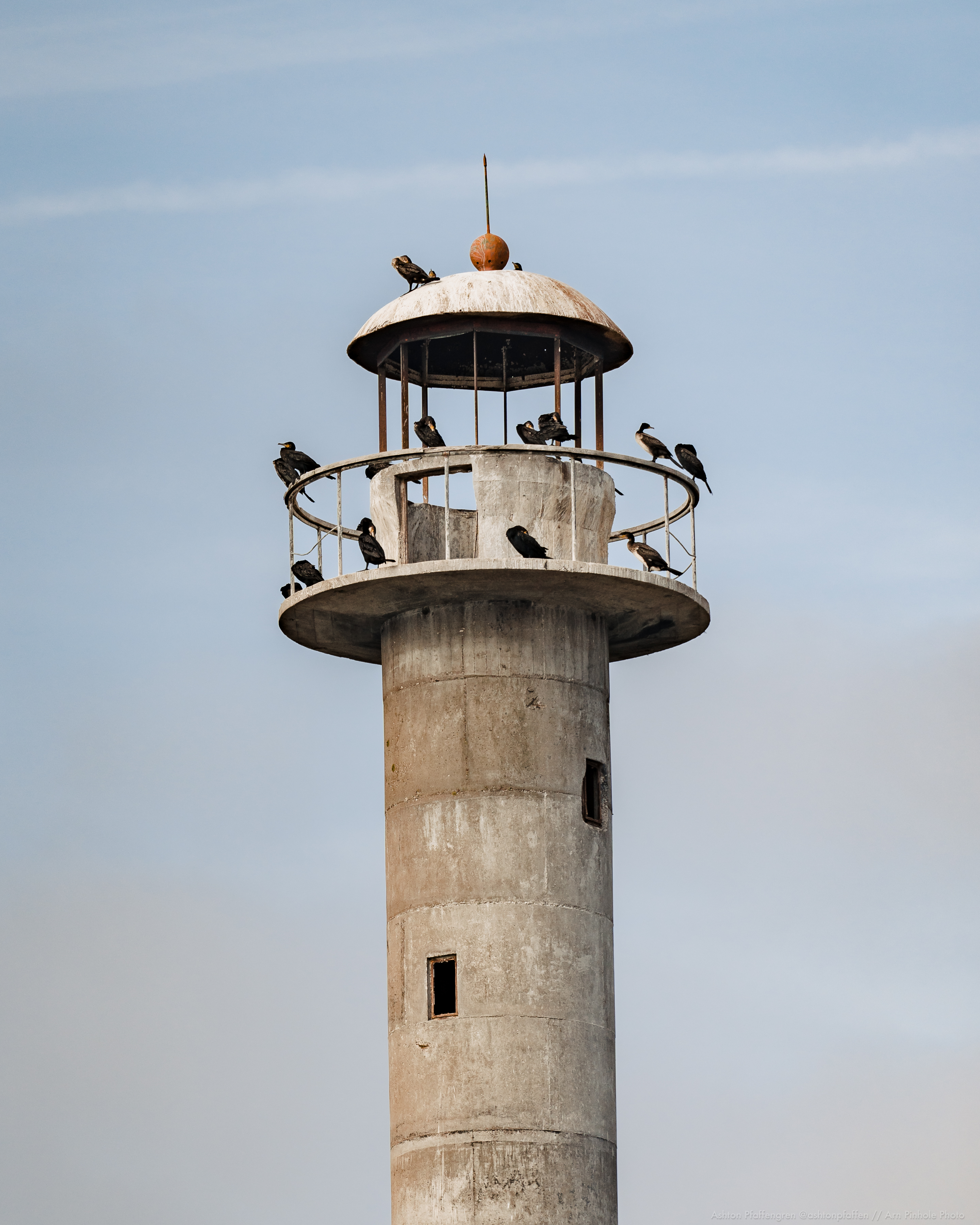
Top (lantern room and cupola) of Kiipsaare Lighthouse occupied by cormorants, 2023

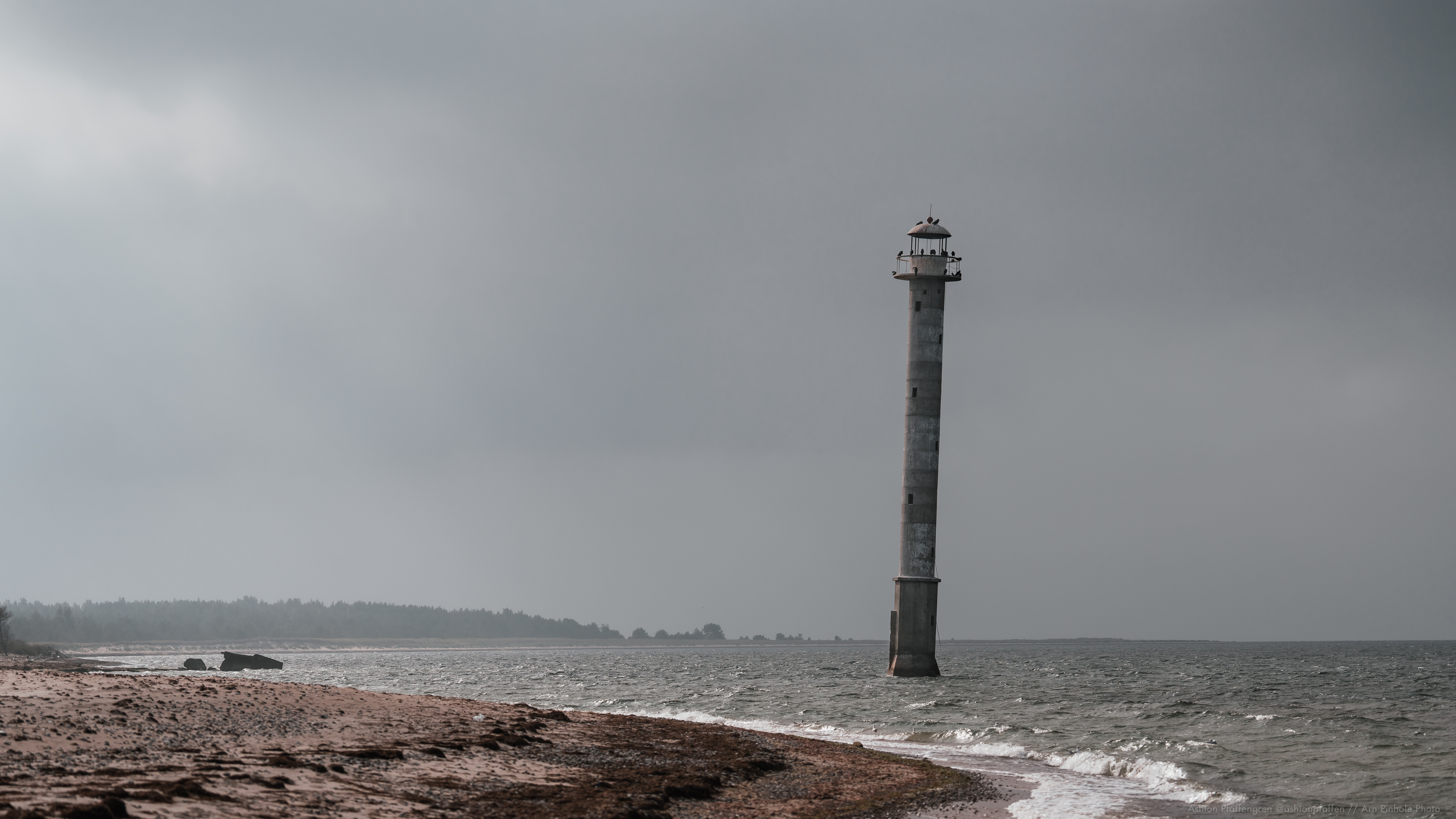
Kiipsaare Lighthouse seen from North-East in the early morning sun, 2023

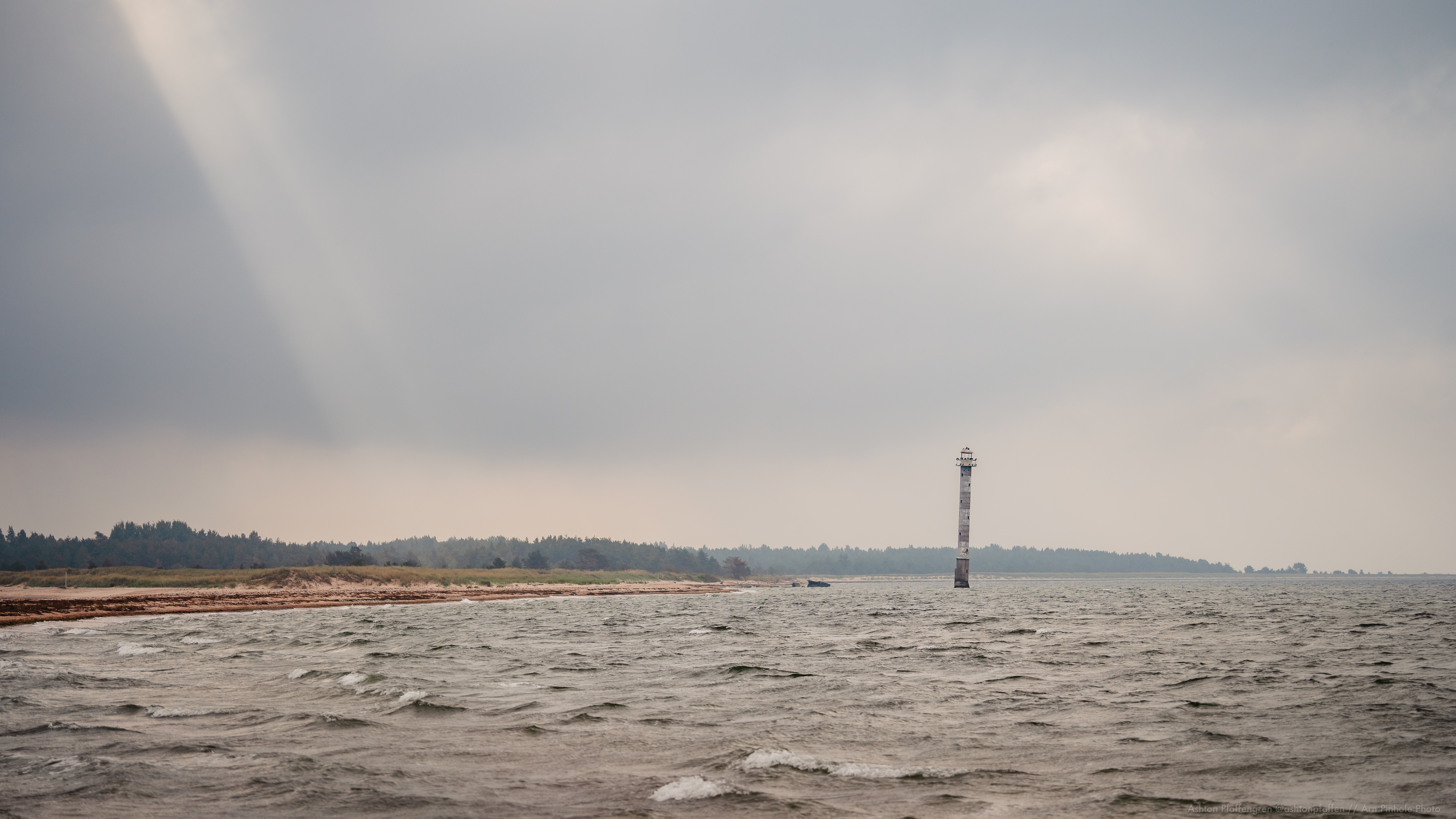
Kiipsaare Lighthouse photographed from Kiipsaare Nukk, 2023

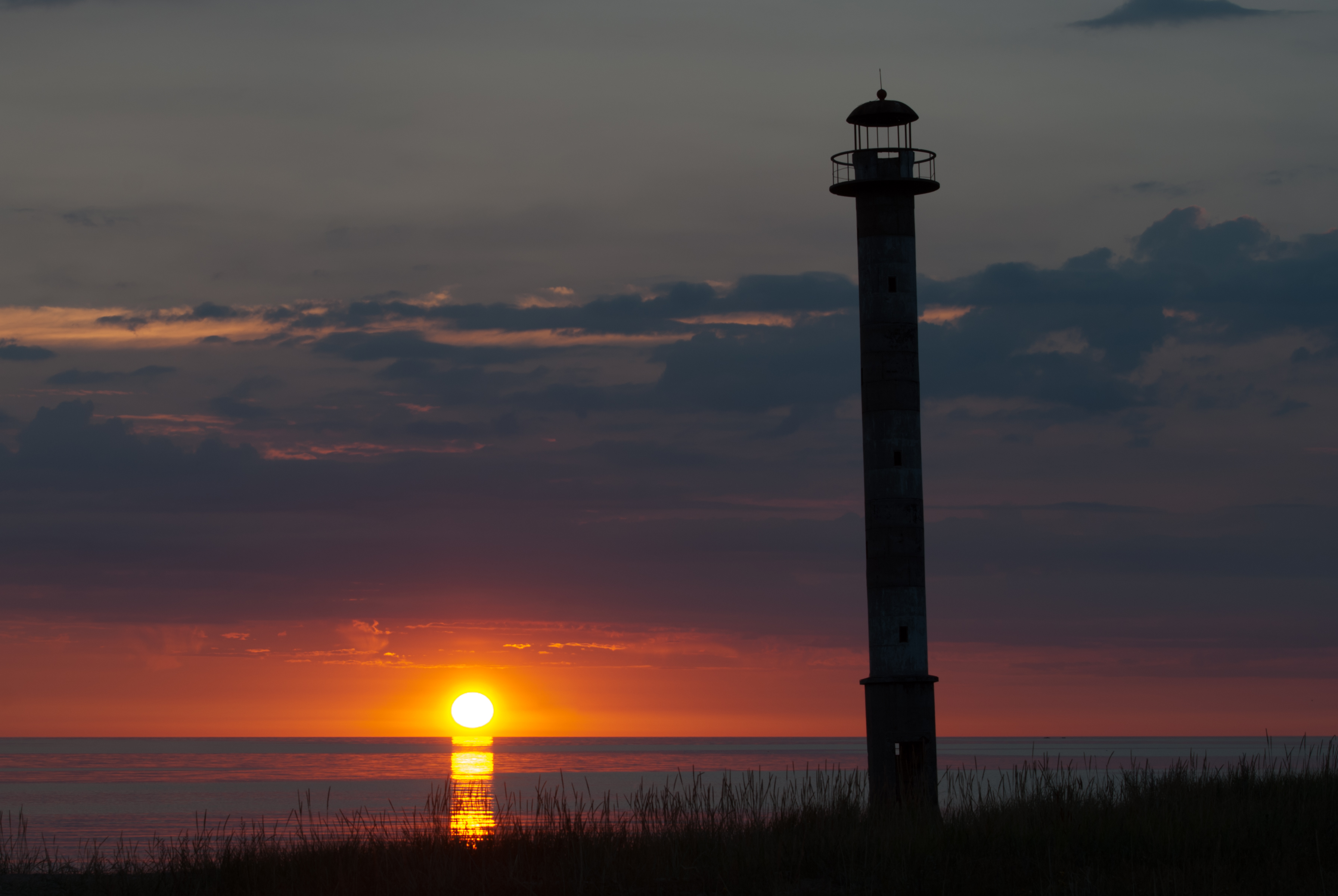
Kiipsaare Lighthouse at sunset (2013)

== See also ==
- List of lighthouses in Estonia
