= Vaigu-Rannaküla =

Village in Estonia

Coordinates: 58°29′14″N 22°01′30″E

- Village
- Interactive map of Vaigu-Rannaküla
- Country: Estonia
- County: Saare County
- Parish: Saaremaa Parish
- Time zone: UTC+2 (EET)
  - Summer (DST): UTC+3 (EEST)

Vaigu-Rannaküla (Rannaküla until 2017) is a village in Saaremaa Parish, Saare County in western Estonia.

Before the administrative reform in 2017 the village was in Kihelkonna Parish.
