= Pidula-Kuusiku =

Village in Estonia

Coordinates: 58°24′53″N 22°09′14″E

- Village
- Interactive map of Pidula-Kuusiku
- Country: Estonia
- County: Saare County
- Parish: Saaremaa Parish
- Time zone: UTC+2 (EET)
  - Summer (DST): UTC+3 (EEST)

Pidula-Kuusiku (Kuusiku until 2017) is a village in Saaremaa Parish, Saare County in western Estonia.

Before the administrative reform in 2017, the village was in Kihelkonna Parish.
