= Viidu-Mäebe =

Village in Estonia

Coordinates: 58°18′21″N 22°04′47″E

- Village
- Interactive map of Viidu-Mäebe
- Country: Estonia
- County: Saare County
- Parish: Saaremaa Parish
- Time zone: UTC+2 (EET)
  - Summer (DST): UTC+3 (EEST)

Viidu-Mäebe (Mäebe until 2017) is a village in Saaremaa Parish, Saare County in western Estonia.

Before the administrative reform in 2017, the village was in Kihelkonna Parish.
