= Juksirahu =

Island in Estonia

Coordinates: 58.3489°N 21.8744°E

Juksirahu is an island belonging to the country of Estonia.

The island is in the Gulf of Riga and is part of Saare County.

It is a uninhabited island and is similar as the island of Vahelmisrahu, having little information on these islands.

== See also ==
- List of islands of Estonia
