= Kihelkonna =

Borough in Estonia

- Small borough
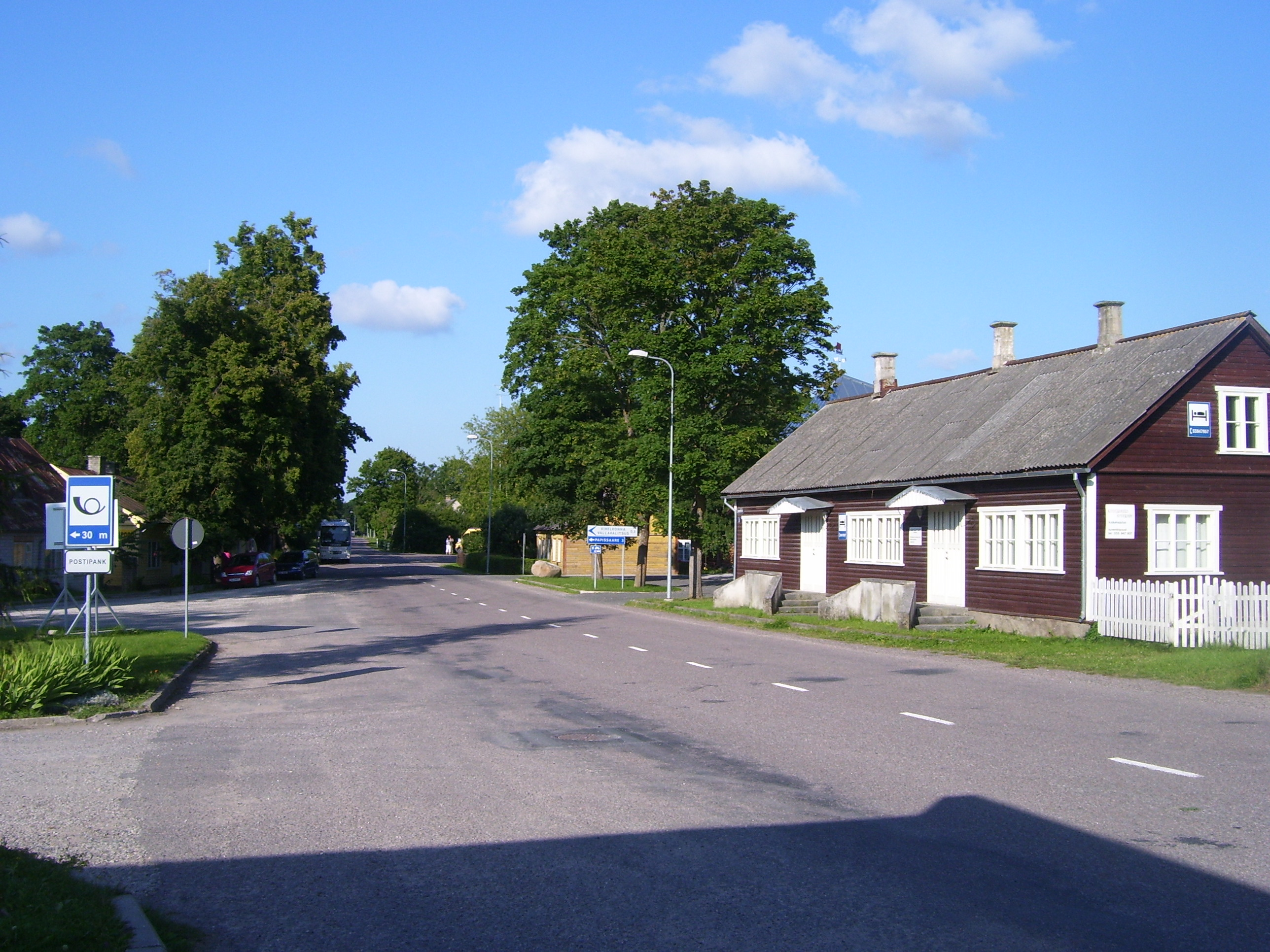
- Town center of Kihelkonna

- Location within Estonia
- Coordinates: 58°21′N 22°03′E
- Country: Estonia
- County: Saare
- Parish: Saaremaa

Population (1 January 2020)
  - Total: 314
- Time zone: UTC+2 (EET)
  - Summer (DST): UTC+3 (EEST)

Kihelkonna (German: Kielkond) is a small borough (Estonian: alevik) in Saaremaa Parish, Saare County in western Estonia. Until 2017 it was the administrative centre of Kihelkonna Parish, and currently it is the centre of the Kihelkonna district (osavald) of Saaremaa Parish.

== Name ==
The name Kihelkonna (literally 'parish': nominative kihelkond, genitive kihelkonna) originally referred to the parish connected with the settlement's church; the settlement did not develop until the 19th century. The name was attested in written sources as Kiligunde c. 1200, Kylegunde in 1235, and Kylekund in 1645. The linguist Paul Ariste reconstructed the original form of the name as the generic term *kihlakonta 'hundred' (cf. Finnish kihlakunta 'hundred'). It is hypothesized that Kihelkonna was the first parish established on Saaremaa.

== Gallery ==
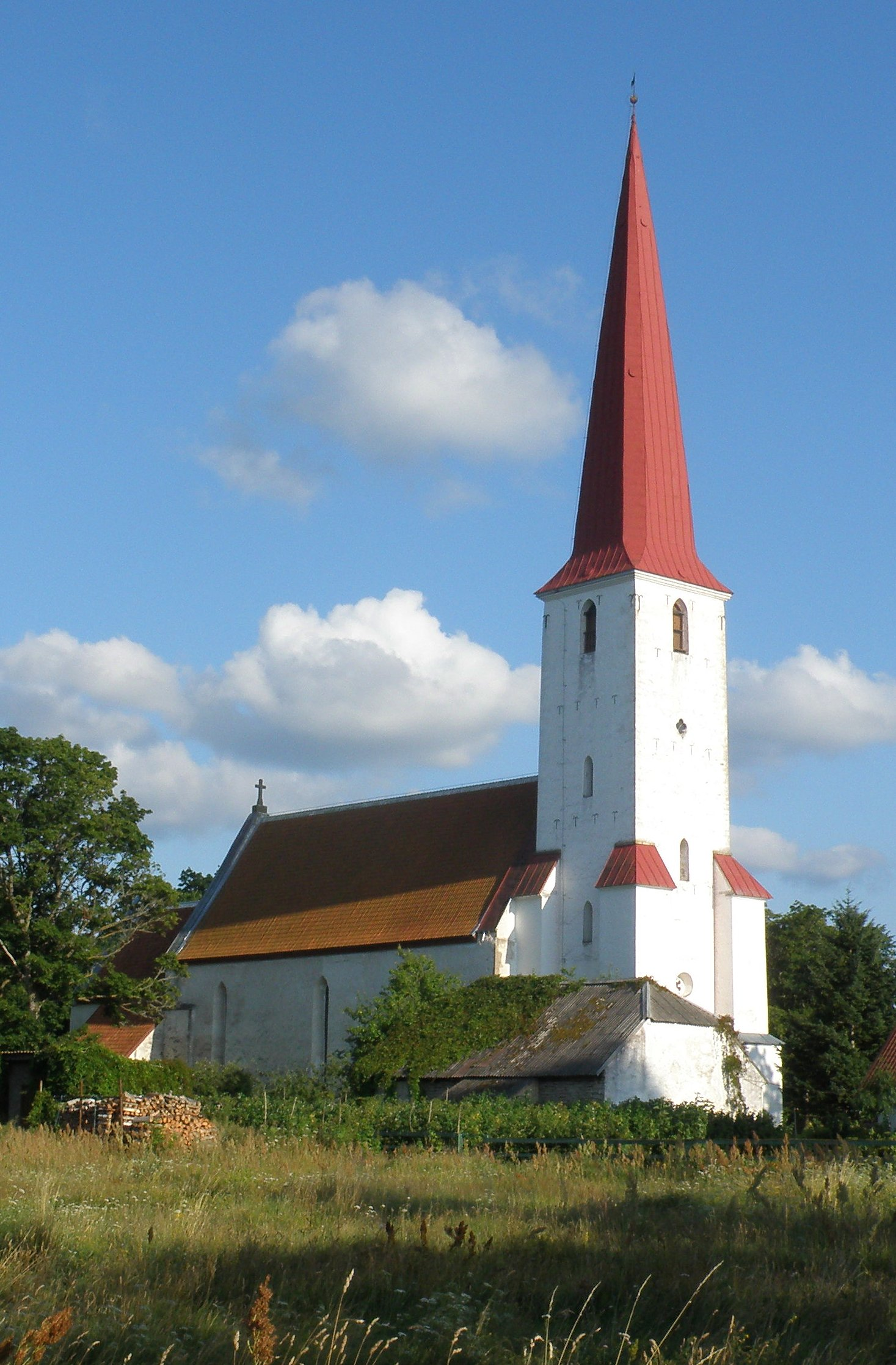
Kihelkonna St. Michael's Church

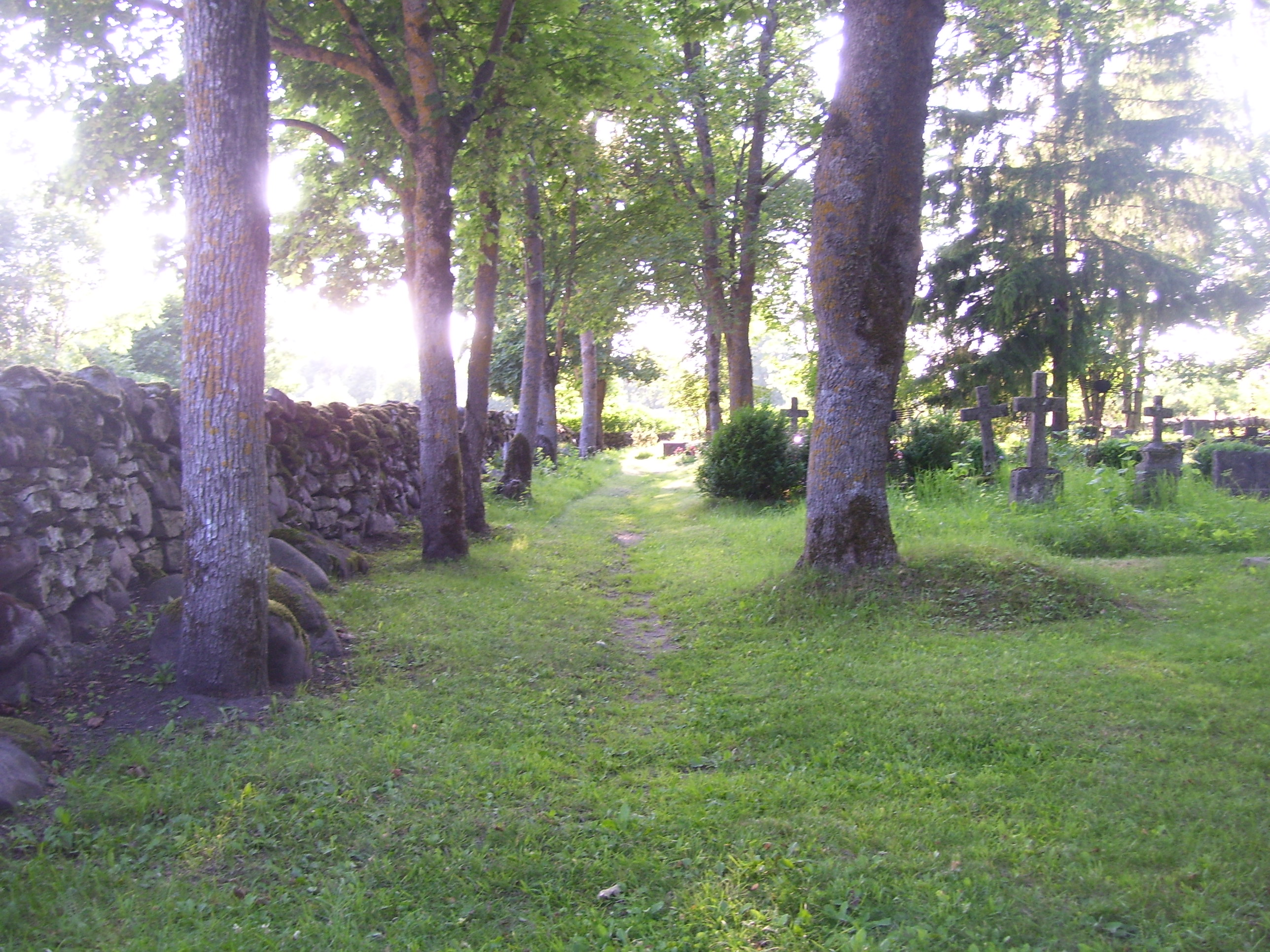
Kihelkonna cemetery

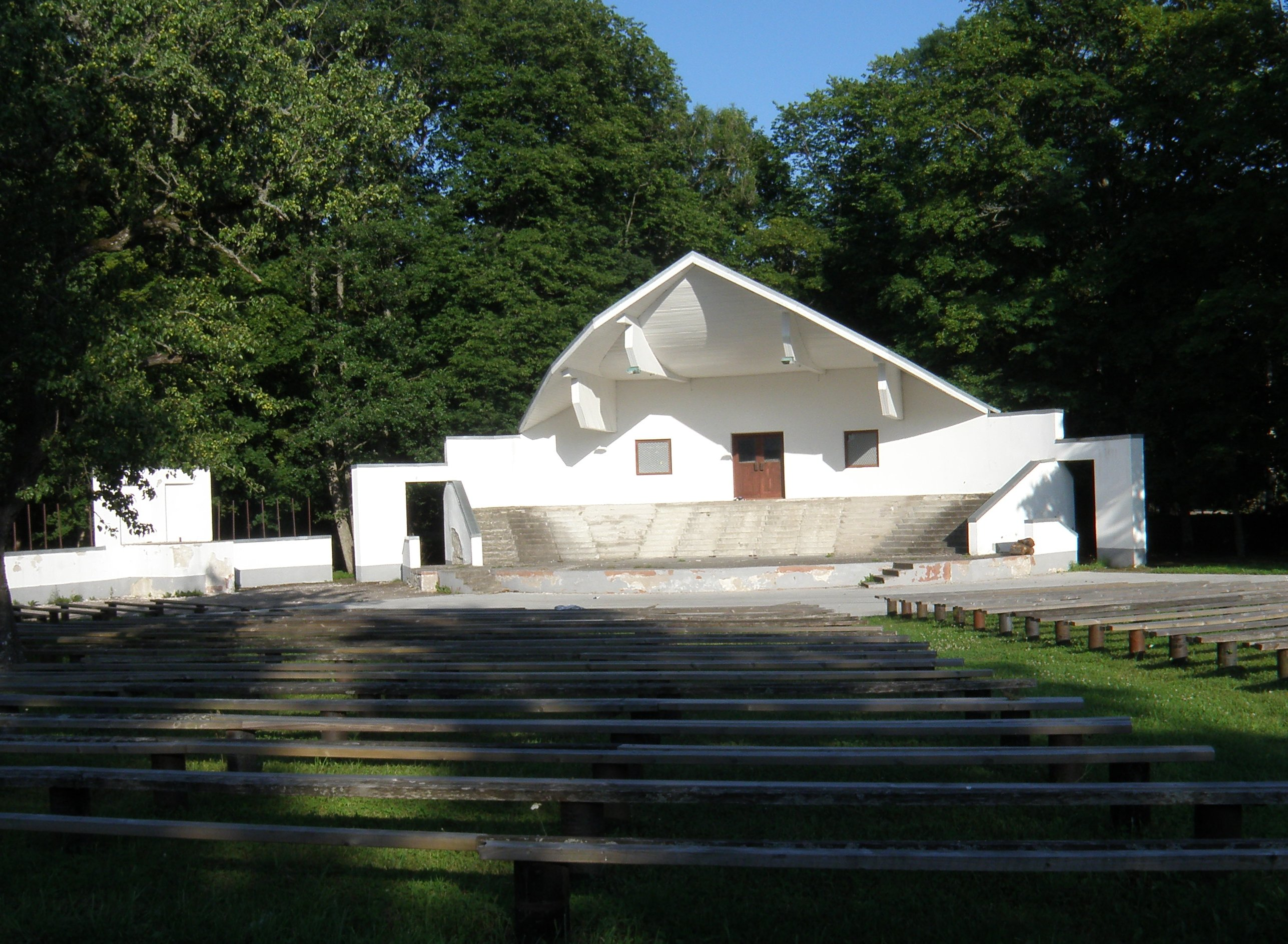
Kihelkonna bandstand

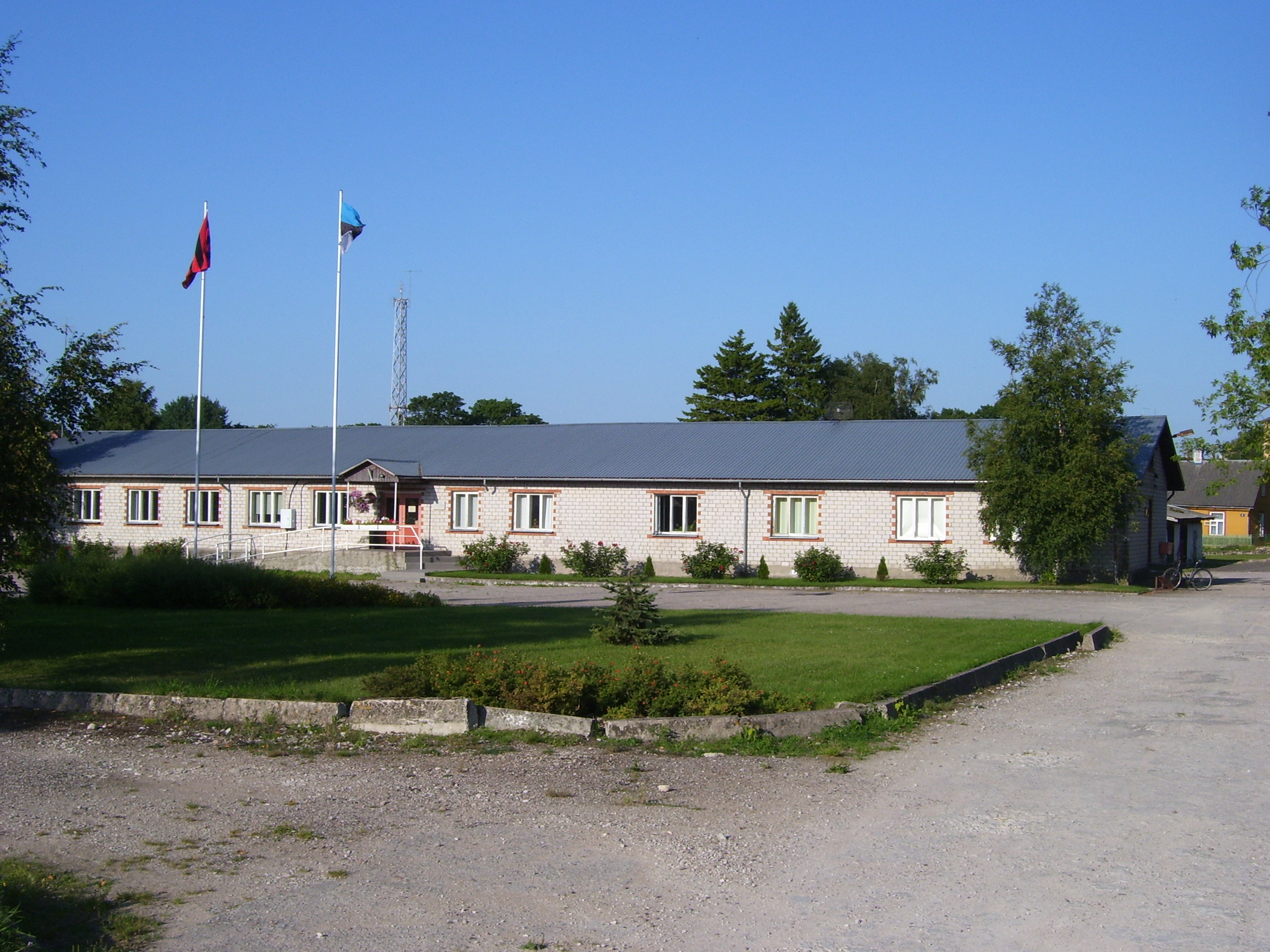
Local government building of Kihelkonna Parish

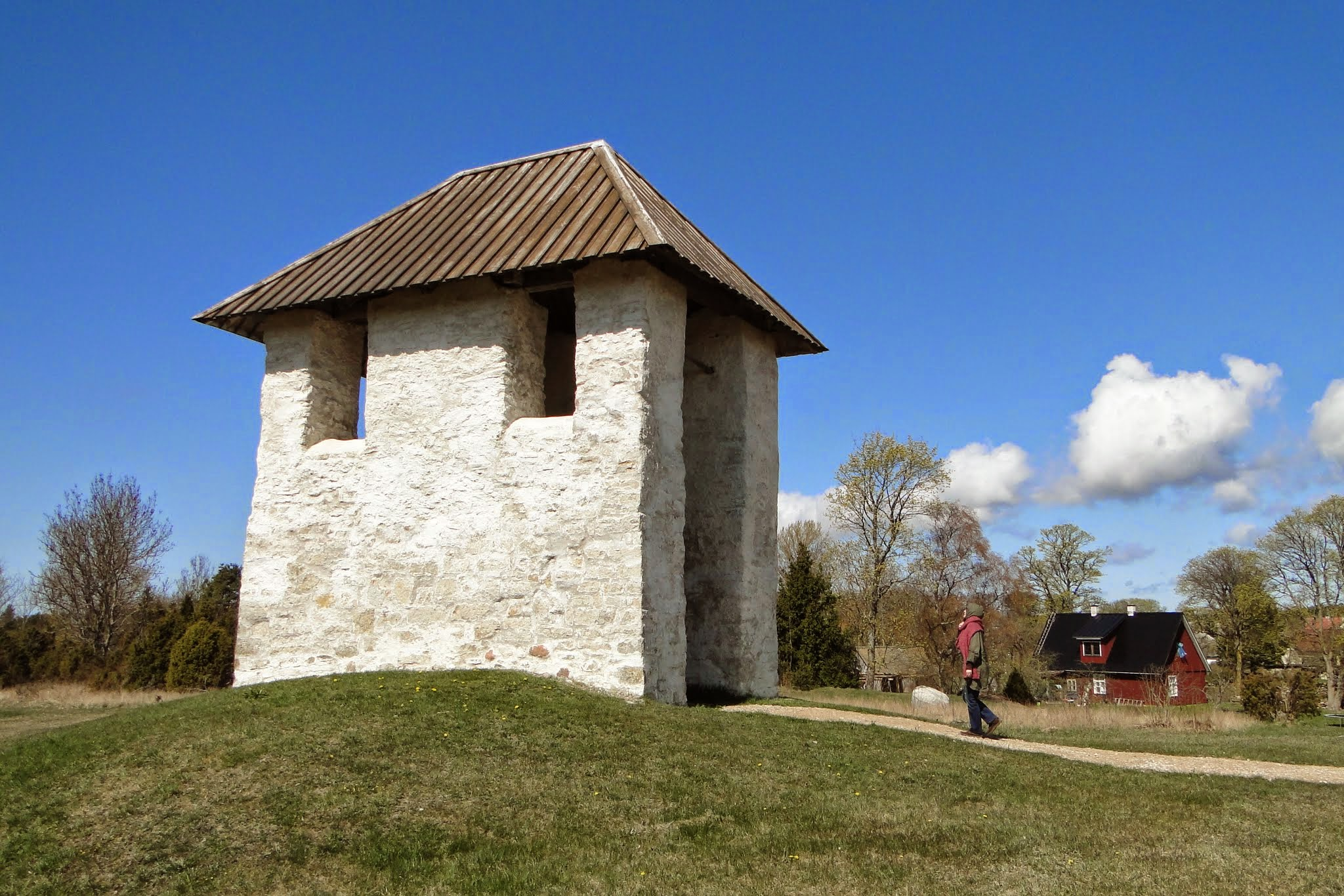
Old bell tower

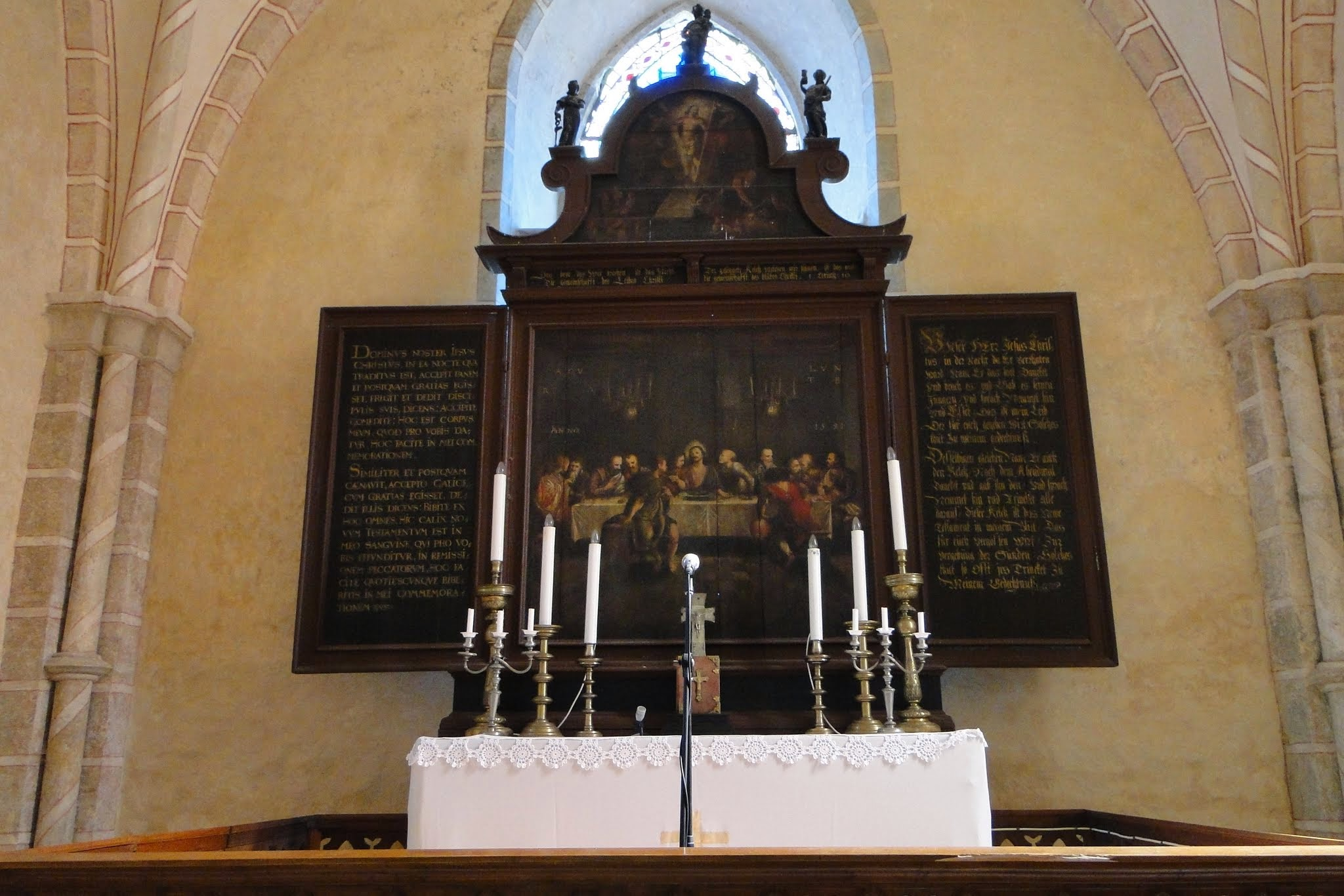
Altar in St. Michael's church
