= Maturahu =

Island in Estonia

Coordinates: 58°22′04″N 21°49′51″E

Maturahu is an island belonging to the country of Estonia.

== See also ==
- List of islands of Estonia
