= Harilaid (islet) =

Island in Estonia

Coordinates: 58°58′N 23°05′E

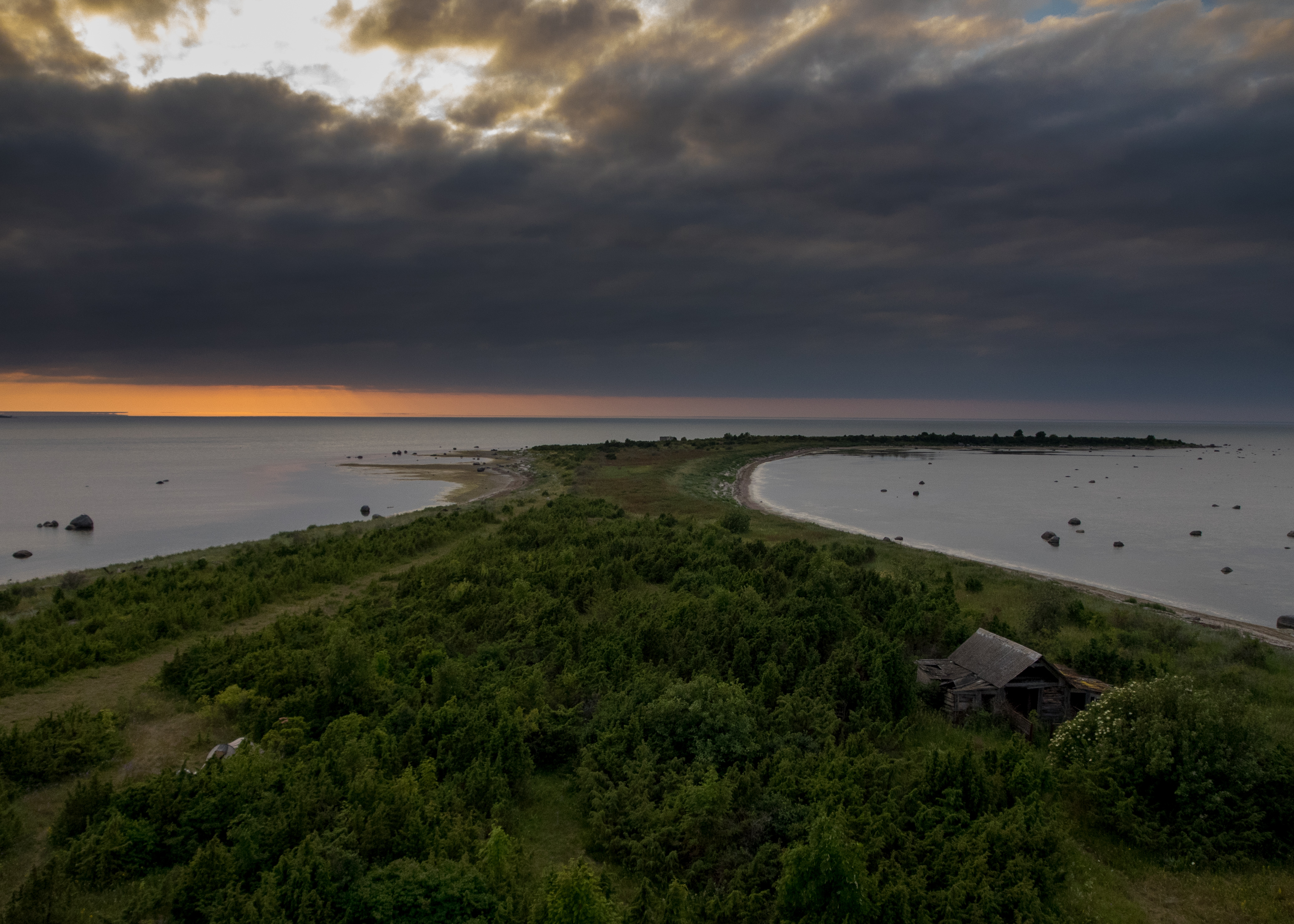

Harilaid (Swedish Hares, formerly Gräsö) is a small uninhabited island in Estonia. It lies about 4 kilometres (2 mi) west of the island of Vormsi. It should not be confused with the larger former island of Harilaid that is now a peninsula on the northwest coast of the island of Saaremaa.

Harilaid has an area of 15 hectares (37 acres). Its highest point is 2.9 metres (9 ft 6 in) above sea level. The island is stony, with a covering of juniper.

A lighthouse was first built on Harilaid in 1933. The present lighthouse is 19 metres (62 ft) high.
