= Harilaid (peninsula) =

Peninsula in Estonia

Coordinates: 58°29′N 21°51′E

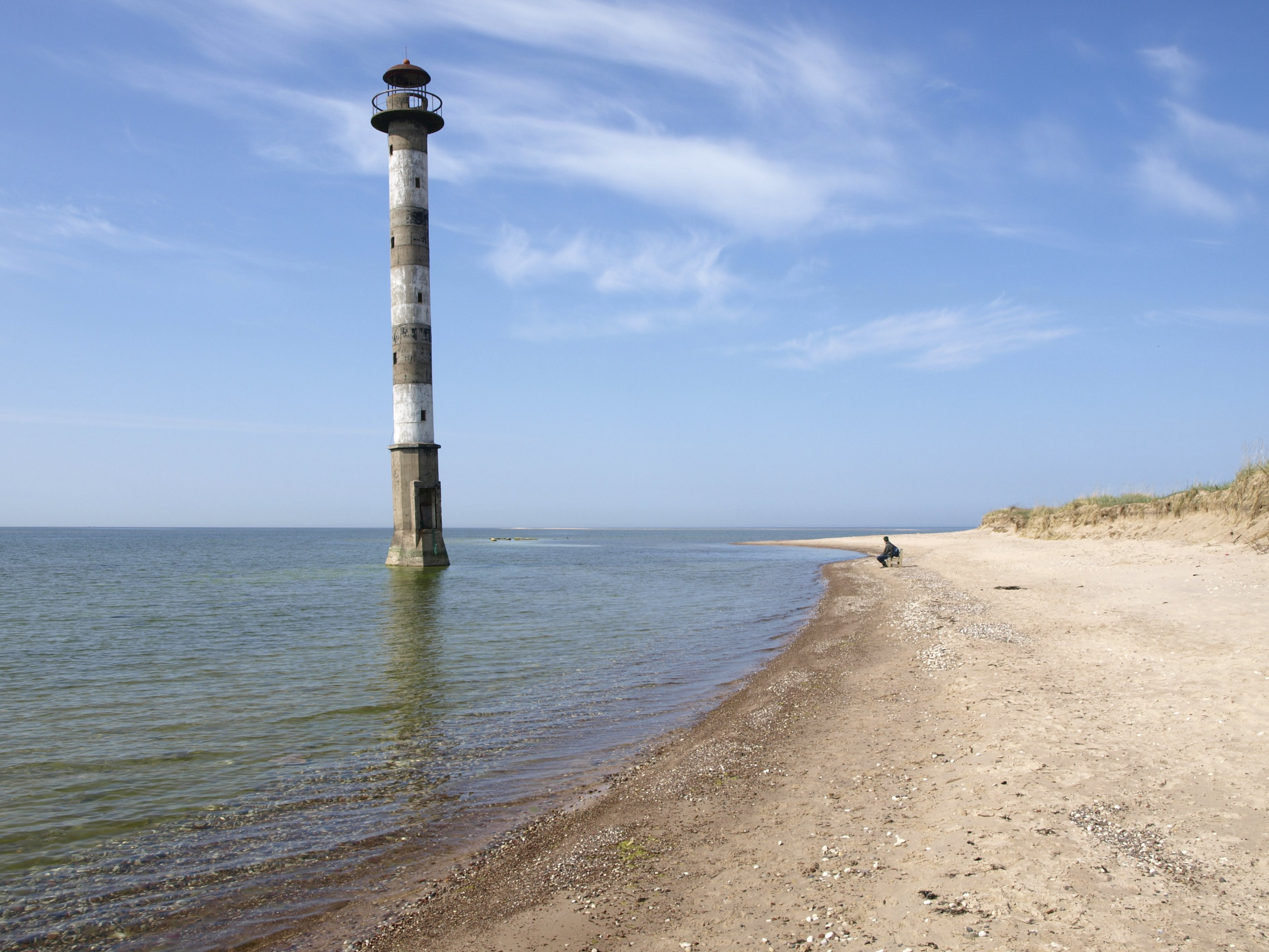
The Kiipsaare Lighthouse (2008) was formerly on land

The Harilaid Peninsula is a peninsula on the northwest coast of the island of Saaremaa in Estonia. It should not be confused with the islet of Harilaid, which lies between the islands of Vormsi and Hiiumaa.

Harilaid covers an area of 4.5 km^{2} (1.7 sq mi) and is low lying (the highest elevation is 4.6 m (15 ft)). It is connected to the mainland by a 300-metre (980 ft) wide neck of land, and it was a separate island until the end of the 17th century.

Large numbers of birds stop on Harilaid on their migration route, and there is a resting site of grey seals on the west coast. There is a large pine plantation on the peninsula, started in the 1970s and inhabited by elk and wild boar. The peninsula was added to Vilsandi National Park in 1993.

There is no record of a settled population on the peninsula. The Kiipsaare Lighthouse was built at the tip of the peninsula in 1933. At that time, the lighthouse was almost 100 metres (330 ft) inland, but it is now a few metres offshore. It is now unused and has a pronounced lean as a result of erosion. The Estonian war film Somnambuul was shot there in 2004.

Access to the peninsula is by a rough road from Kihelkonna.
