= Vilsandi National Park =

Protected area in Estonia

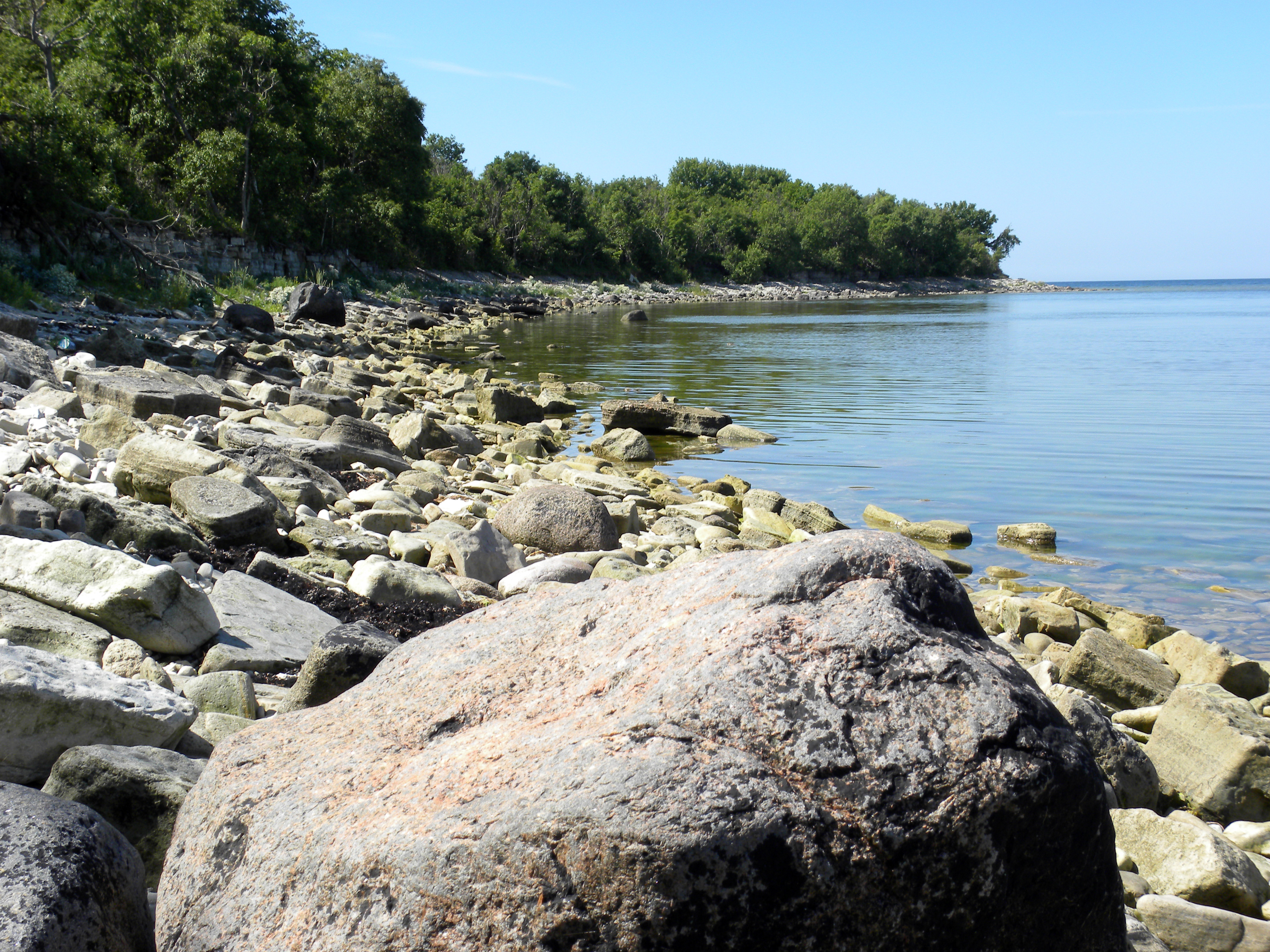
- Soeginina coastline, Vilsandi National Park during summer.

- Location within Estonia
- Interactive map of Vilsandi National Park
- Location: Estonia
- Coordinates: 58°22′43″N 21°52′38″E
- Area: 241.0 km^{2} (93 mi^{2})
- Established: 1957

Ramsar Wetland
- Designated: 17 June 1997
- Reference no.: 913

Vilsandi National Park (Estonian: Vilsandi rahvuspark) is a marine protected area in Saaremaa Parish, Saare County, Estonia. It includes part of the island of Vilsandi, a number of smaller islands and adjacent parts of western Saaremaa including the Harilaid peninsula.

== Environment ==
The park grew from a bird reserve founded in 1910. It is a highly sensitive ecosystem, which is used as a stop-over area by many migratory birds, like barnacle geese and Steller's eider and as a breeding and nesting ground for over 247 species of birds, of which the most common is the eider duck. One third of all protected plant species in Estonia are found in the national park. Hunting is absolutely prohibited.

The park is a popular tourist destination for both Estonians and foreign visitors, particularly from Finland. It has been designated an Important Bird Area (IBA) by BirdLife International. It supports breeding and wintering populations of many species of waterfowl, as well as common crane populations on passage.

== See also ==
- Protected areas of Estonia
- List of national parks in the Baltics
- List of protected areas of Estonia
- List of Ramsar sites in Estonia
