= Säärenõmme Nature Reserve =

Protected area in Estonia

- Location within Estonia
- Location: Estonia
- Coordinates: 58°35′N 22°58′E
- Area: 395 ha (980 acres)
- Established: 2005

Säärenõmme Nature Reserve is a nature reserve which is located in Saare County, Estonia.

The area of the nature reserve is 395 ha.

The protected area was founded in 2005 to protect valuable habitat types and threatened species in Liigalaskma and Taaliku village (both in former Orissaare Parish).
