= Maasi =

Village in Estonia

- Village
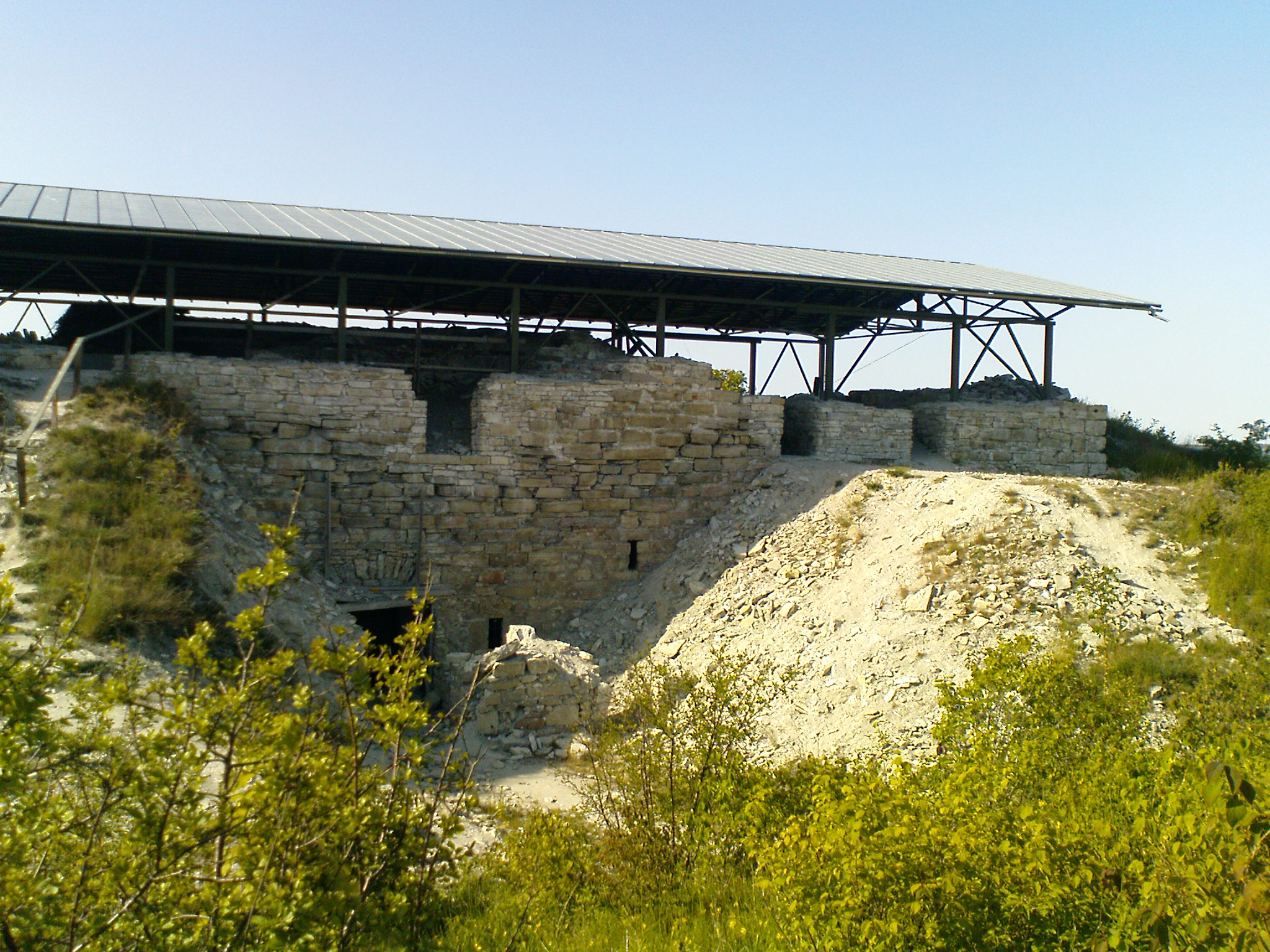
- Ruins of Maasilinna Castle.

- Location in Estonia
- Coordinates: 58°33′51″N 23°02′51″E
- Country: Estonia
- County: Saare County
- Municipality: Saaremaa Parish
- Founded: 1345

Population (01.01.2012)
  - Total: 4,100

Maasi is a village in Saaremaa Parish, Saare County, on the eastern part of Saaremaa Island, Estonia. It is located just northwest from Orissaare, the administrative centre of the municipality. Maasi is bordered by Väike väin Straits on its northeastern side. The village has a population of 4100(as of 1 January 2012).

Before the administrative reform in 2017, the village was in Orissaare Parish. During the reform, the village of Laheküla was merged into the village of Maasi. Formerly (1977–1997), Laheküla was also part of Maasi, but 1997–2017 it was a standalone village.

== Maasilinna Castle ==
Maasi is best known for Maasilinna Castle (German: Soneburg), which in medieval times served as the centre of Eastern Saaremaa and Muhu. It was established in 1345 by Livonian Order' Landmeister Burchard von Dreileben after the complete quelling of the St. George's Night Uprising. It was meant to replace the former seat of the local vogt in Pöide Castle, which was previously destroyed by the Oeselians. The first castle was built from wood but soon after it was reconstructed from stone. The castle was destroyed twice in the Livonian War. Since then it has remained in ruins.

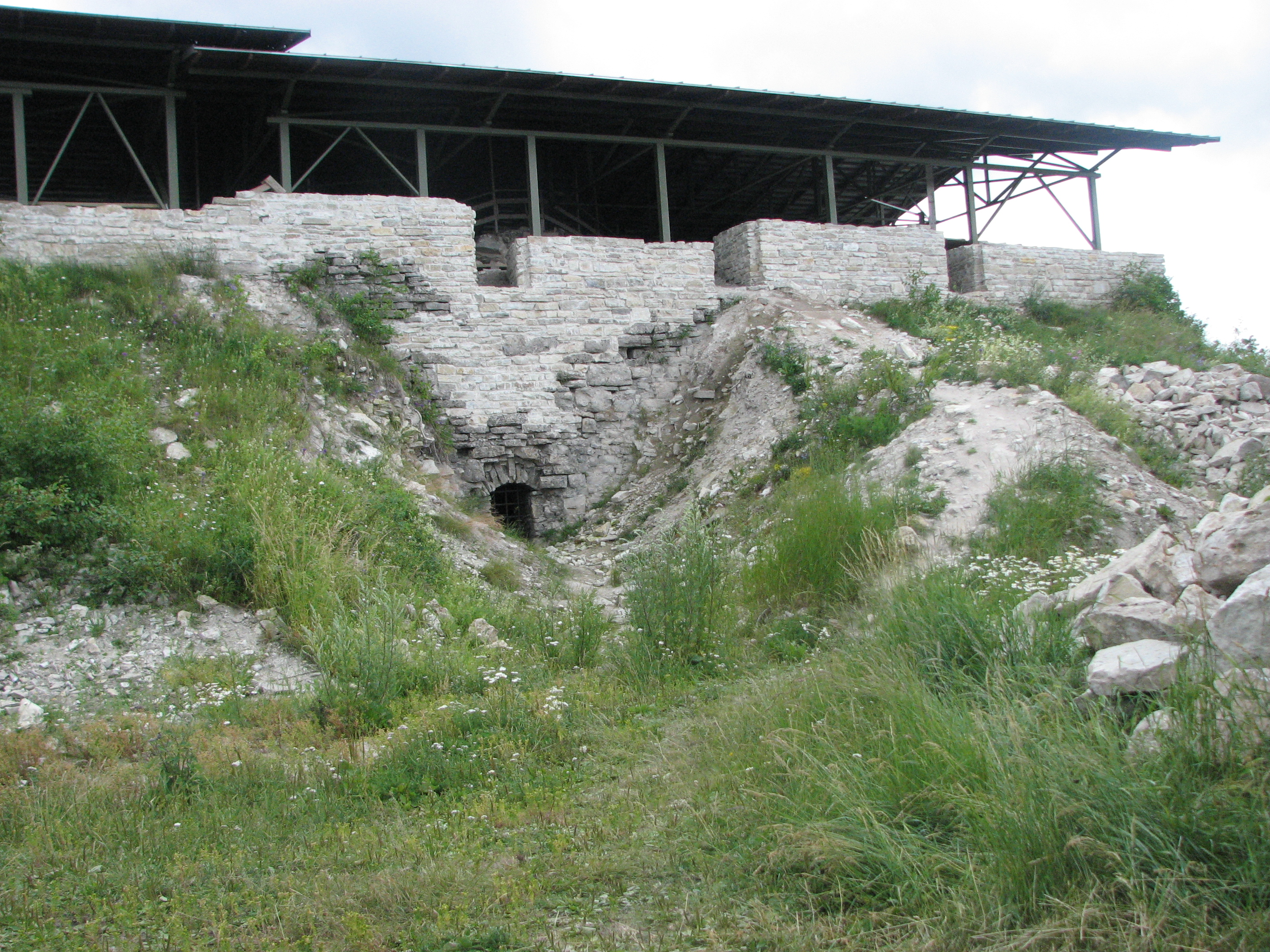

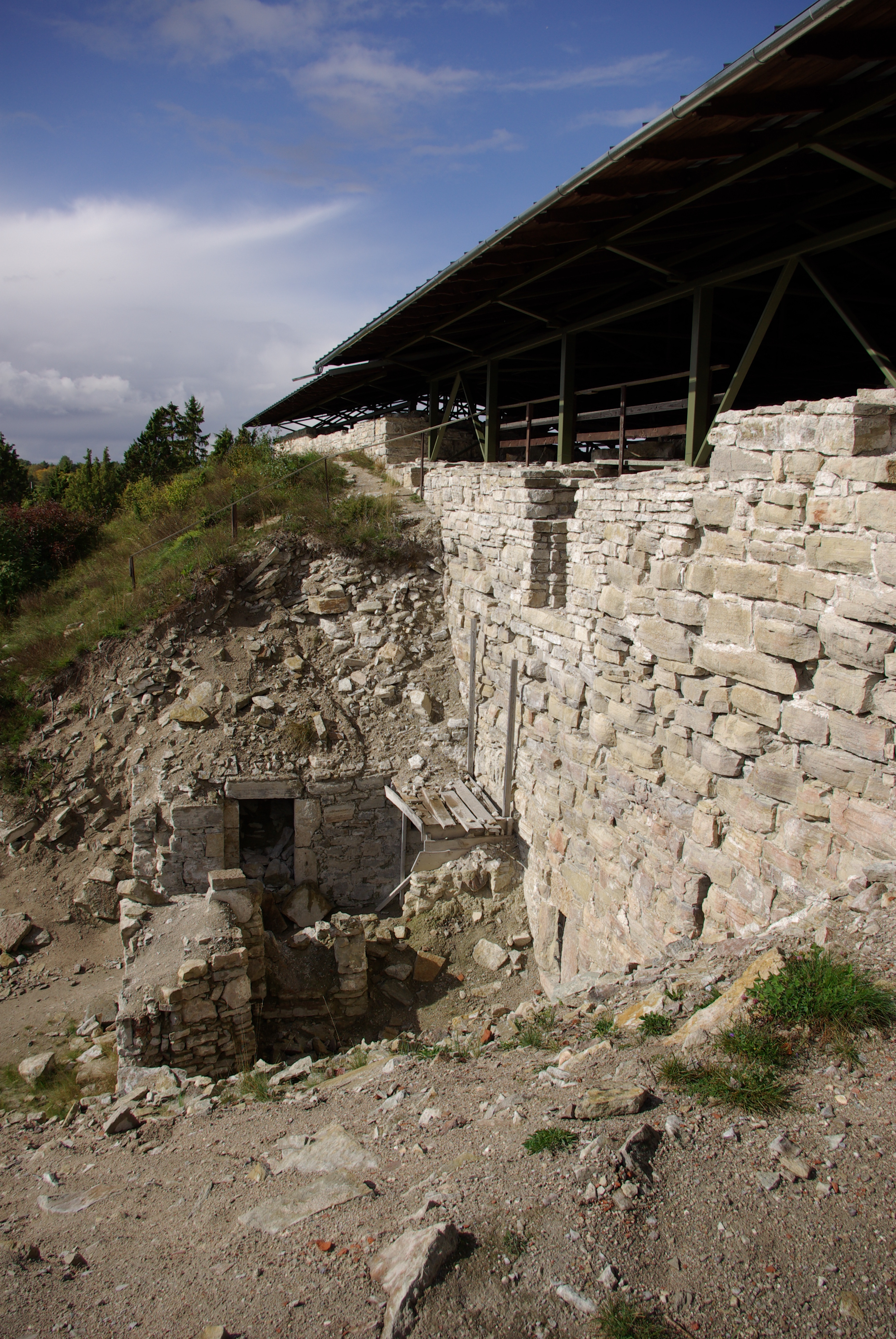

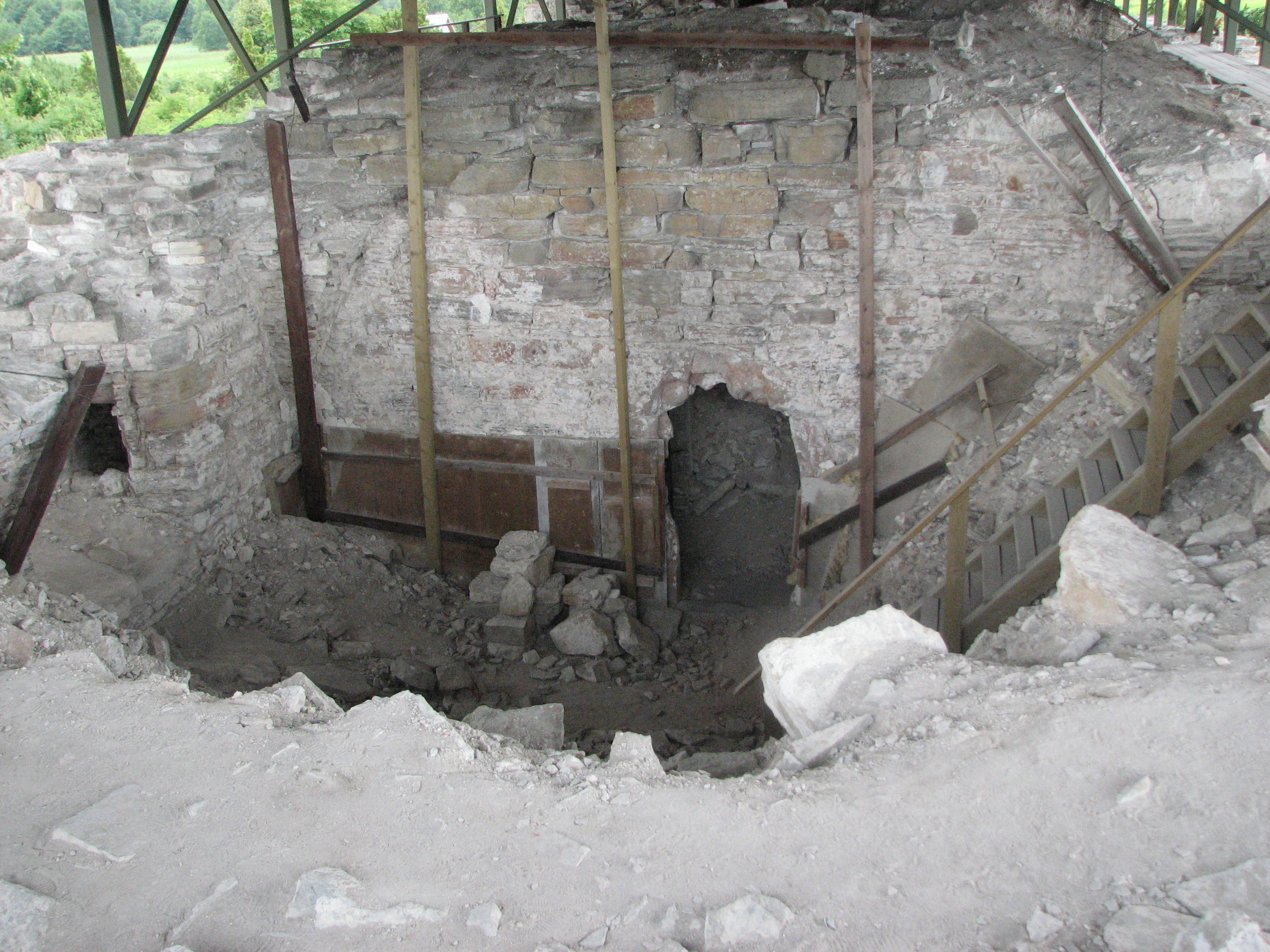

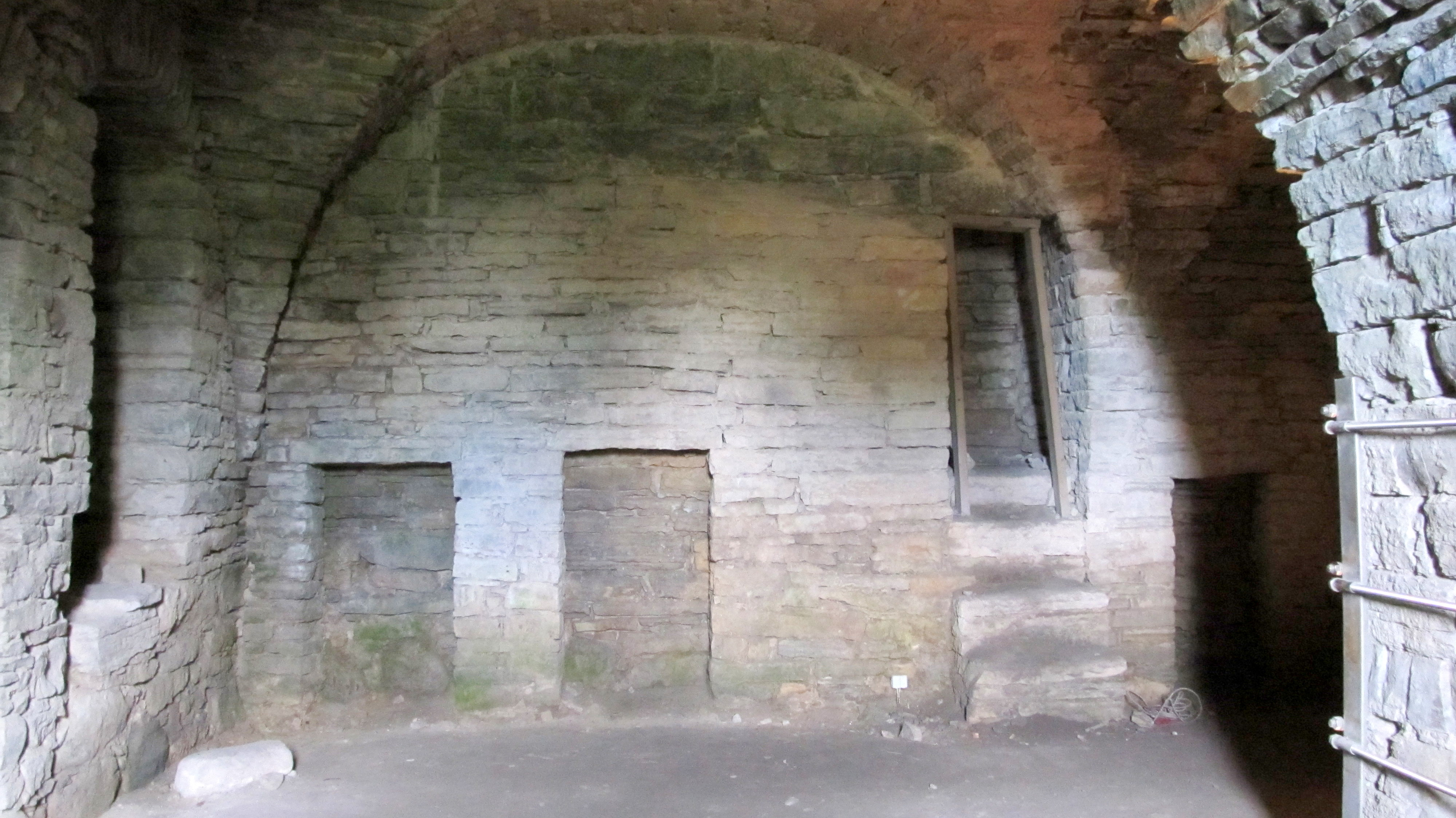
