= Maasi Castle =

Castle in Estonia

Coordinates: 58°34′33.26″N 23°2′12.43″E

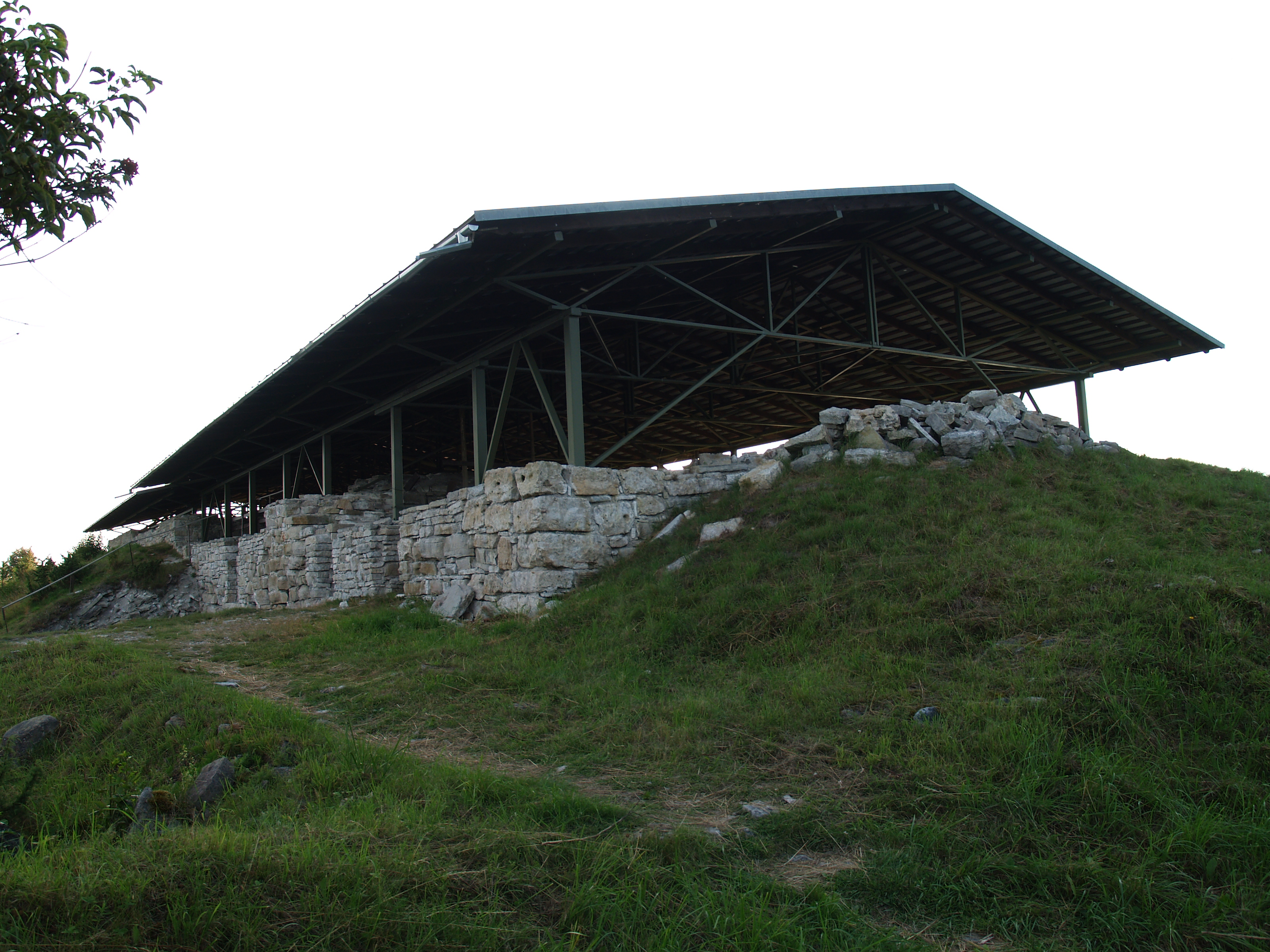
Maasilinn Castle ruins in 2012

Maasilinn Castle (German: Soneburg) is located in the village of Maasi in Orissaare Parish, Saare County, Estonia. It served as the administrative seat of eastern Saaremaa and Muhu in medieval times.

== History ==
It was established in 1345 by Livonian Order' Landmeister Burchard von Dreileben after the St. George's Night Uprising was quelled. It was meant to replace the former seat of the local vogt in Pöide Castle, which had been destroyed by the Oeselians. The first castle was built from wood and was reconstructed from stone. The castle was destroyed twice in the Livonian War. It remained in ruins thereafter.

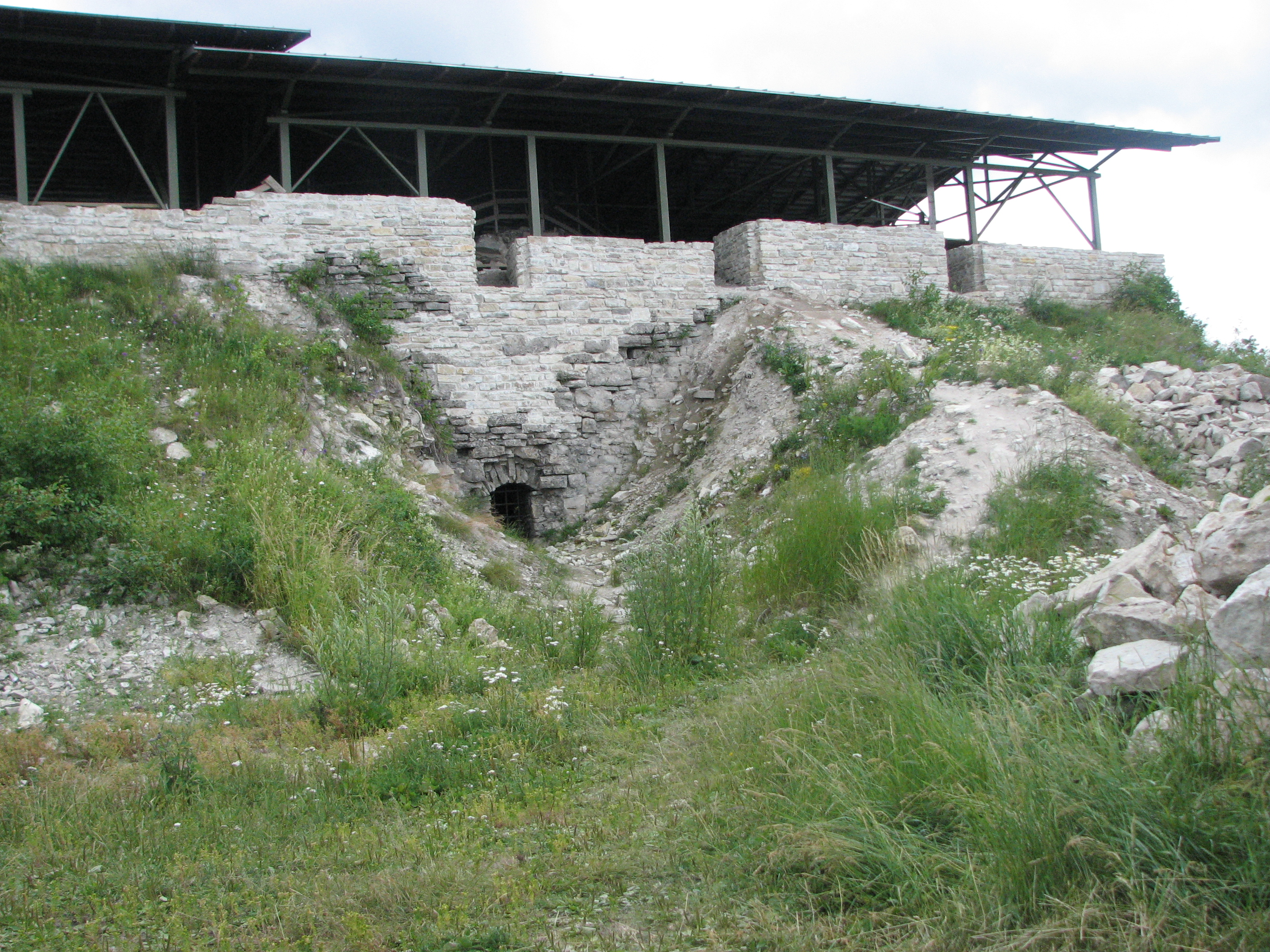

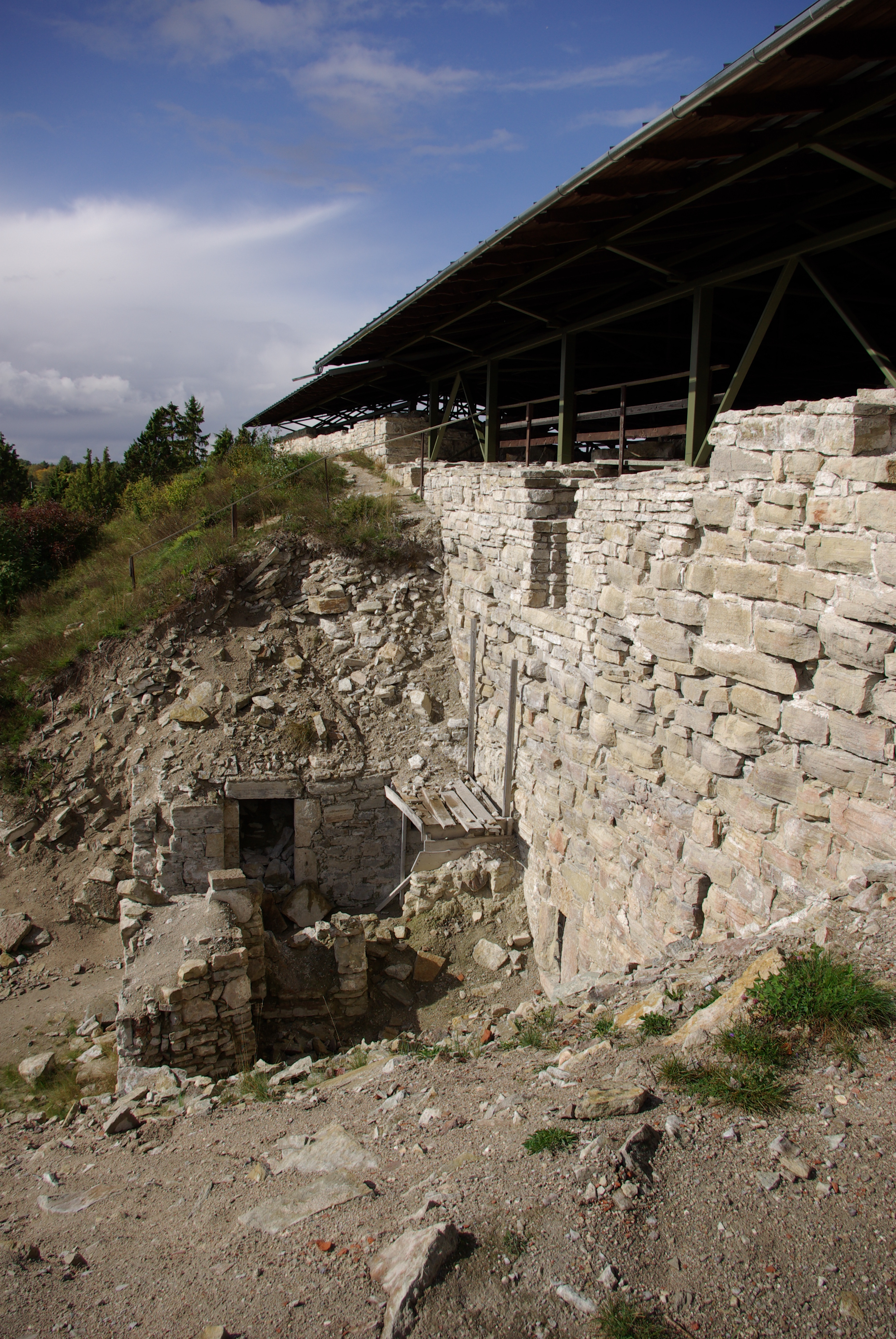

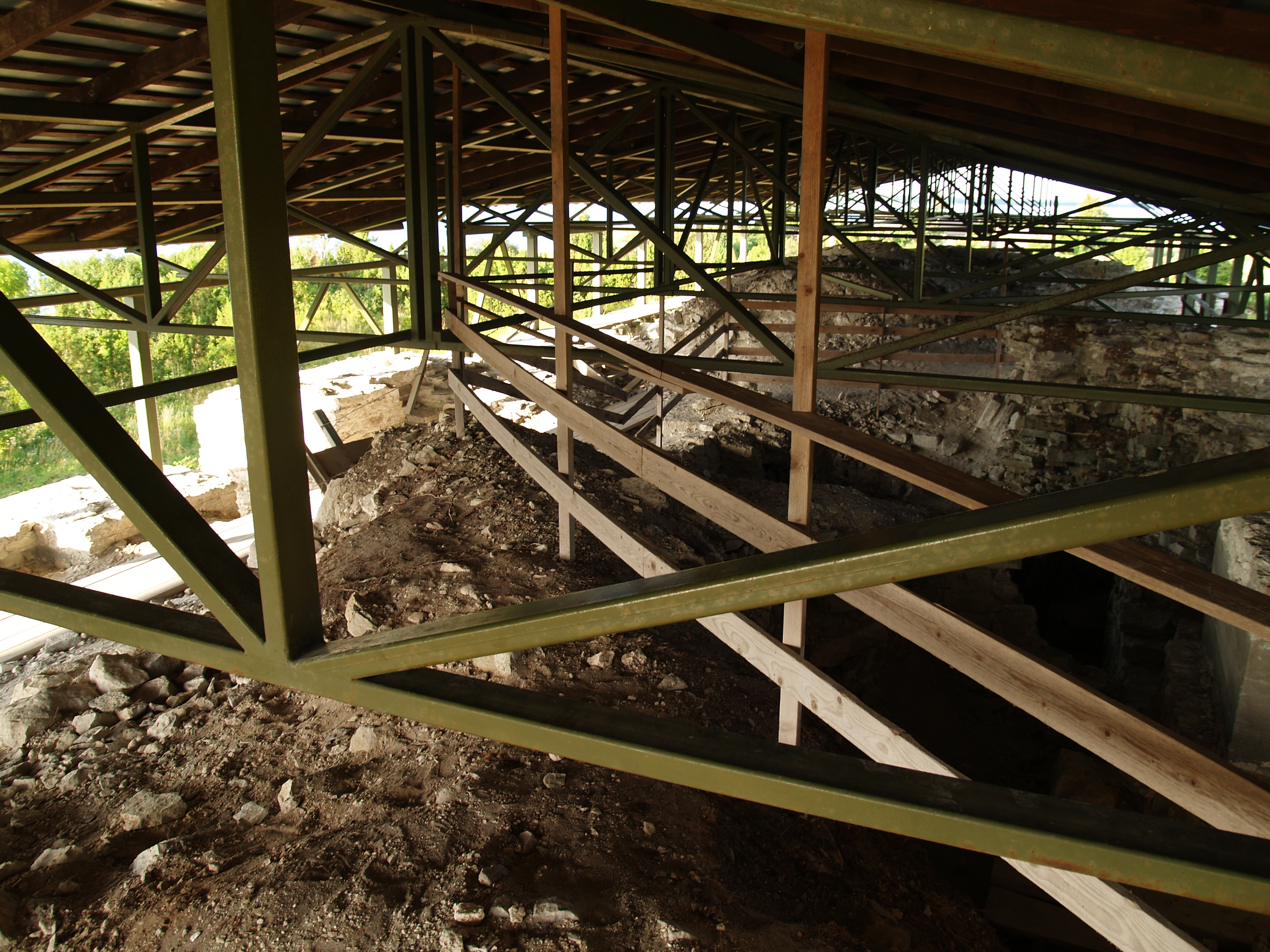

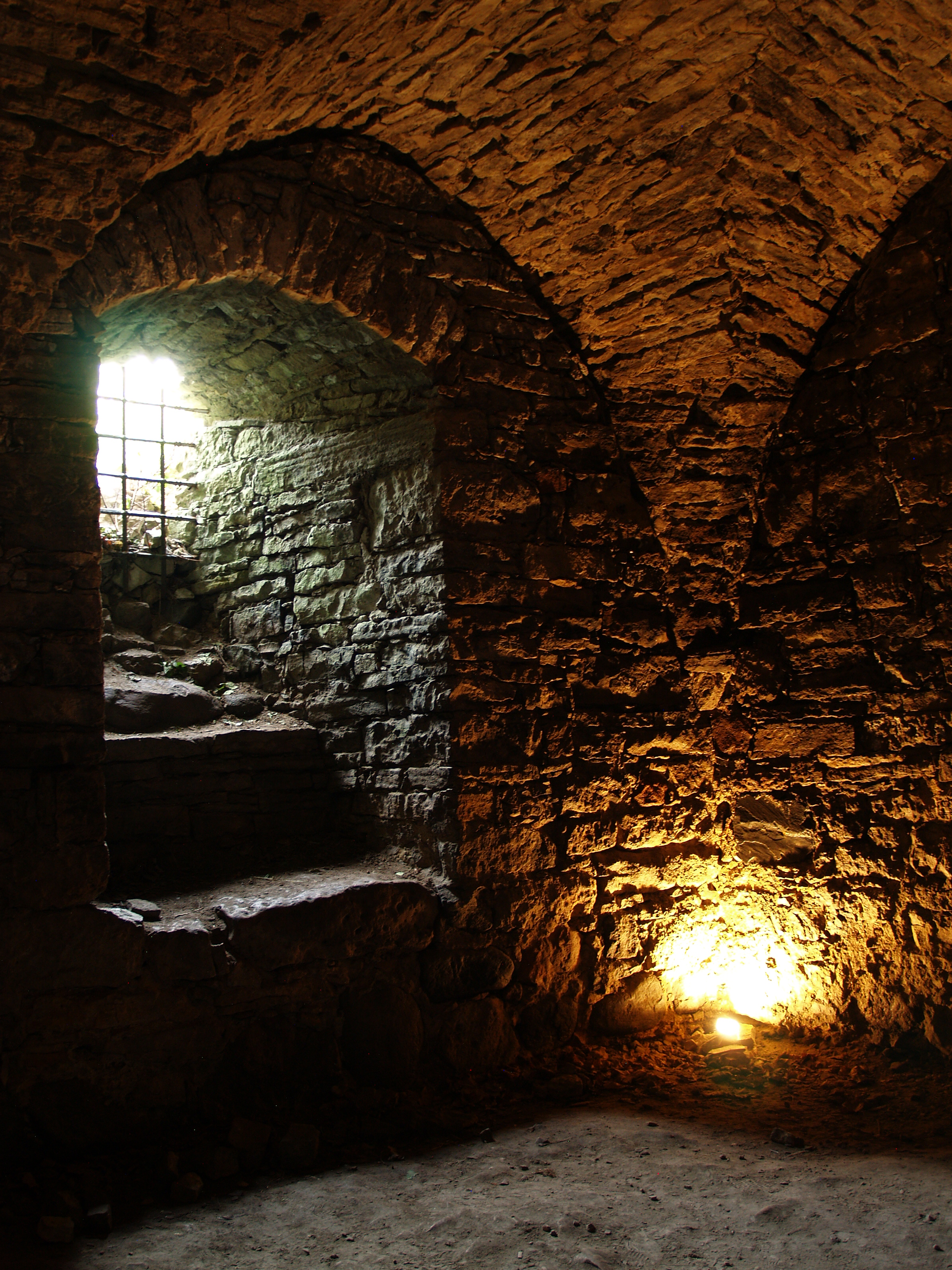

== See also ==
- History of Estonia
- List of castles in Estonia
