= Imavere =

Imavere may refer to the following places in Estonia:

- Imavere, Järva County, a village in Järva Parish
- Imavere, Saare County, a village in Saaremaa Municipality
