= Väljaküla =

Väljaküla may refer to several places in Estonia:

- Väljaküla, Pärnu County, village in Saarde Parish, Pärnu County
- Väljaküla, Orissaare Parish, village in Orissaare Parish, Saare County
- Väljaküla, Pihtla Parish, village in Pihtla Parish, Saare County
- Väljaküla, Saaremaa Parish, village in Saaremaa Parish (formerly Valjala Parish), Saare County
- Väljaküla, Tartu County, village in Alatskivi Parish, Tartu County
- Väljaküla, Valga County, village in Tõlliste Parish, Valga County
