= Pöide Church =

Church building in Estonia

Coordinates: 58°30′40″N 23°02′53″E

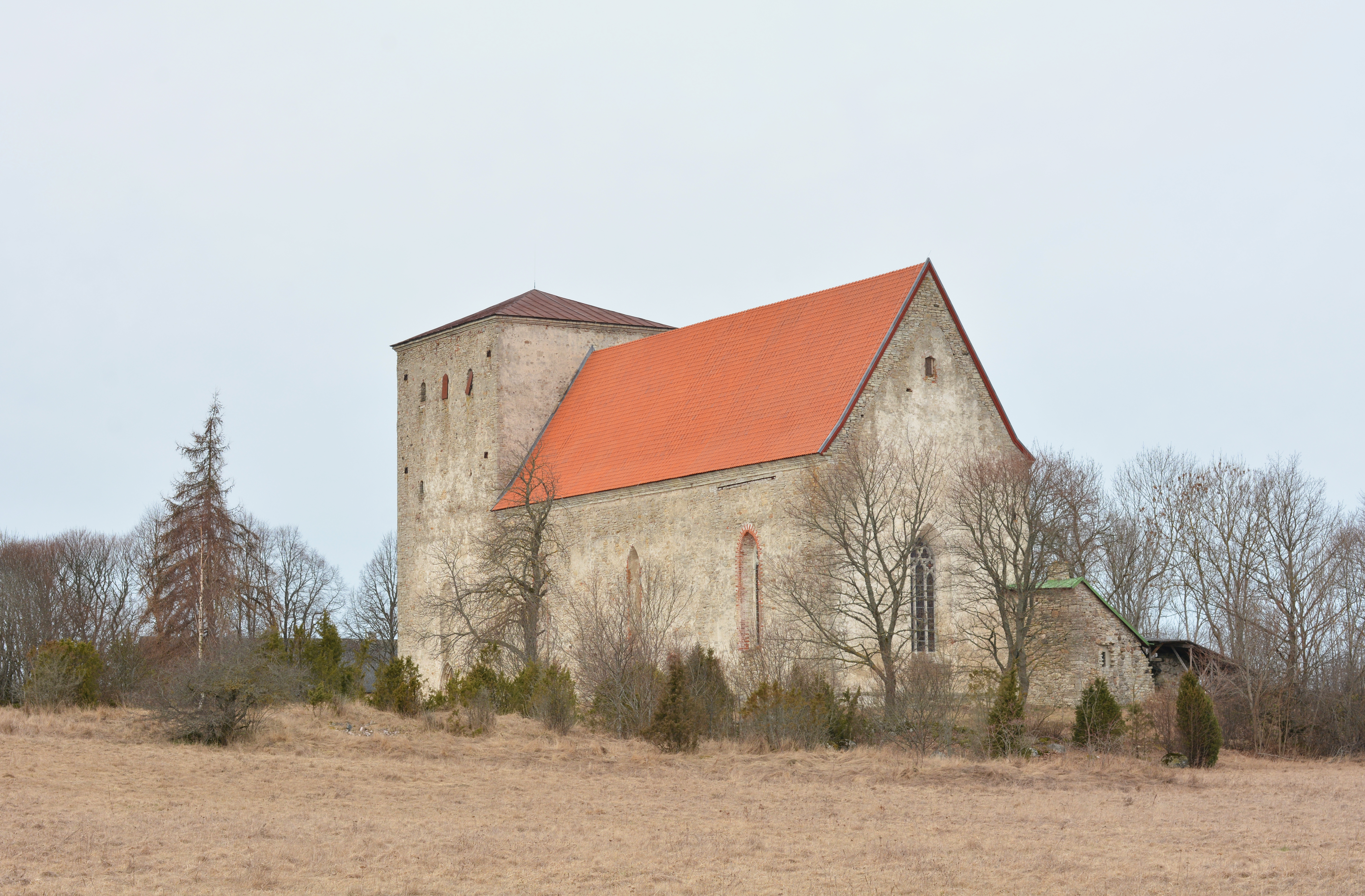
Pöide church

Pöide St. Mary's Church (Estonian: Pöide Maarja kirik) is located on Saaremaa island, in Pöide, Saaremaa Parish, Saare County, Estonia. The church is among the oldest stone buildings in Estonia.

== History ==
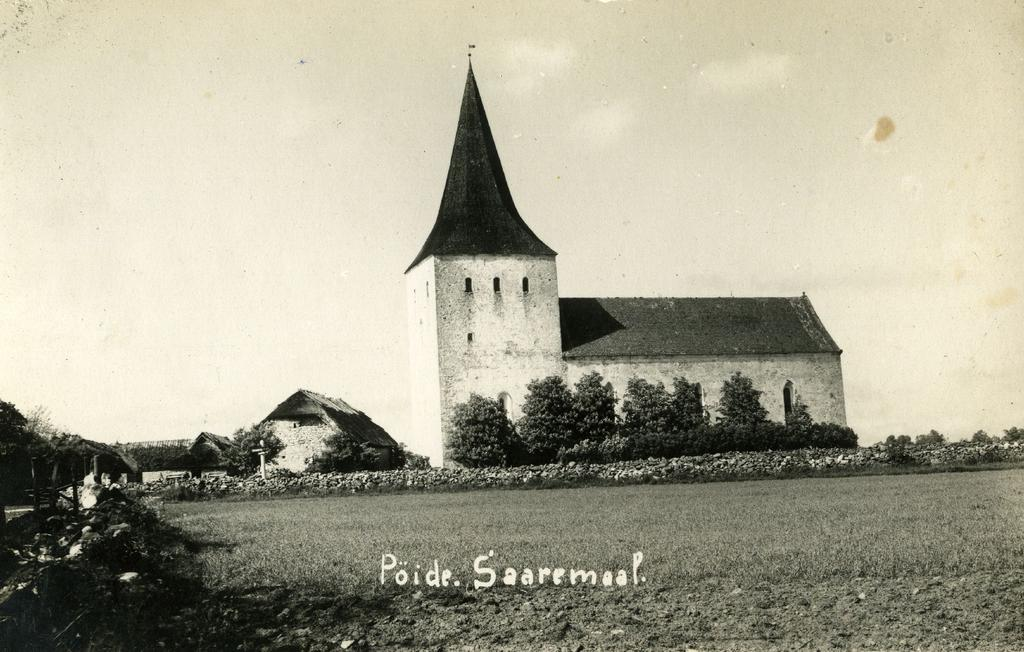
Pöide Church in 1940

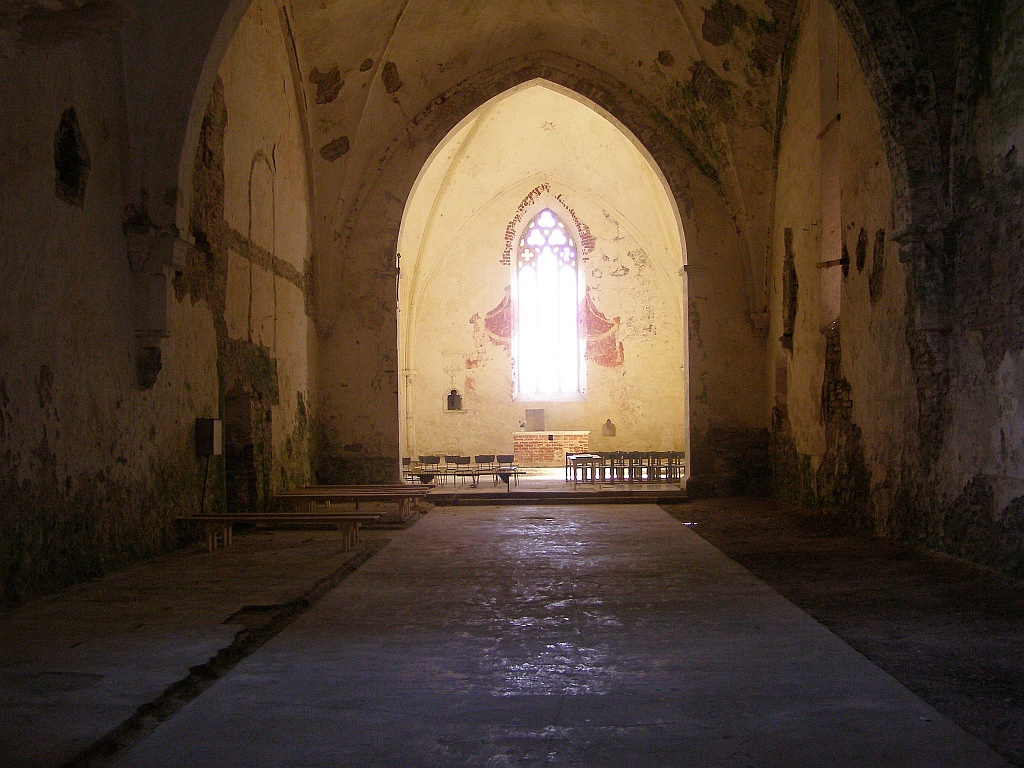
The interior of Pöide church.

The current Pöide Church building is believed to be constructed on the remains of an earlier chapel dating from the 13th century. After the conquest of Saaremaa in 1227, the eastern part of the island belonged to the Livonian Order, who built a fortress at Pöide as their headquarters during the second half of the 13th century. This fortress was destroyed by the Saaremaa natives during the wave of uprisings against the occupying forces that took place in Estonia and Saaremaa during the St.George's Night Uprising of 1343. There was a chapel on the southern side of the fortress, and the walls of this chapel today form the central part of Pöide church.

Owing to its massive form, it is colloquially named the fortress-church.

The building was looted and burnt during World War II and also used as a storage facility. It suffered severe damage in a fire in 1940, when lightning struck the tower. The large crack in the tower from the lightning can still be seen today.

== Cultural heritage ==
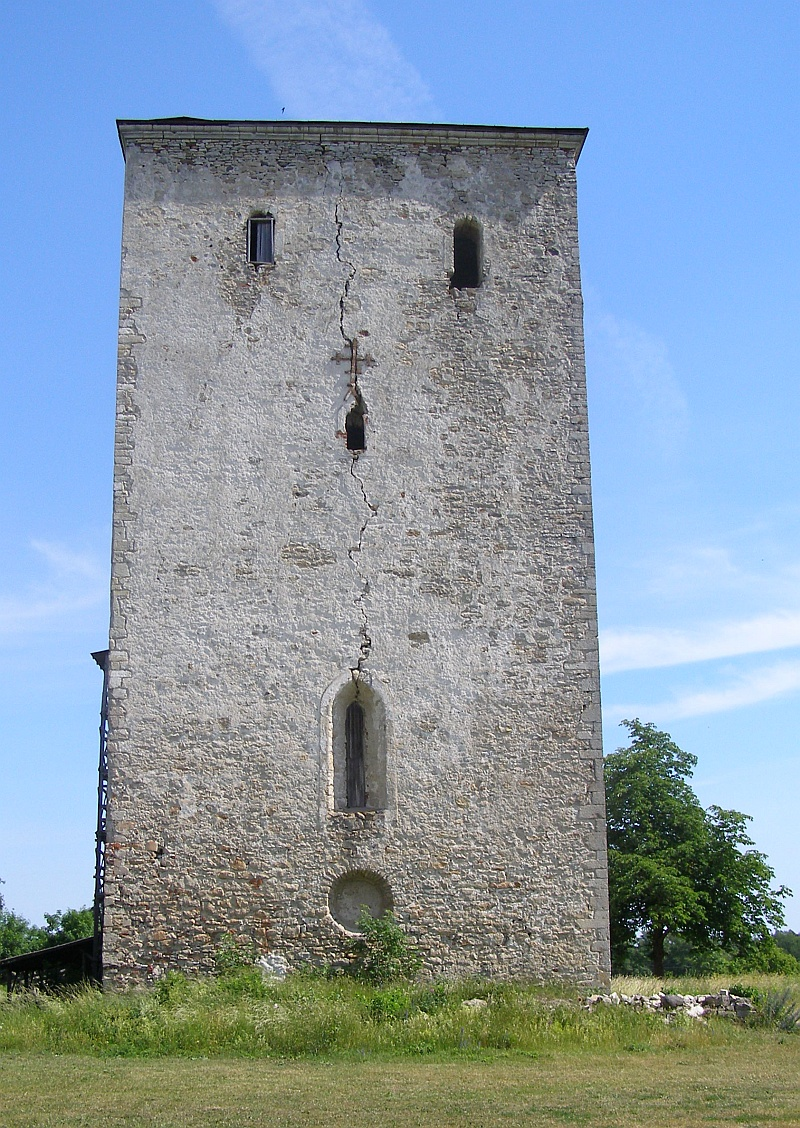
Tower of the church. Note the crack made by a lightning bolt.

Pöide church has been renovated and reconstructed gradually since 1989. The chancel, stone altar, and vestry have been renovated. The main part of the building (including the nave, roof, and spire) still awaits renovation.

Several big tombstones inside the church are displayed behind glass, showing the importance of the church as a cultural centre for nearby communities during previous centuries. These include the tombstone of a headless knight, Heinrich von Schulmann, a nobleman from nearby Tumala estate, who was executed in 1613 (during the Danish reign) in Copenhagen for being politically connected with the Swedish authorities.

== Congregation ==
Today, a small Estonian Evangelical Lutheran Church congregation is active, with about 30 members. In the summer, church services are held twice a month in the church building. During the winter, the services are held in nearby pastorate. On 28 July 2006 the first Roman Catholic wedding was held in Pöide church since the Reformation era.

== See also ==
- Saaremaa
- Estonia
