= Järveküla, Saare County =

Village in Estonia

Järveküla
- Village
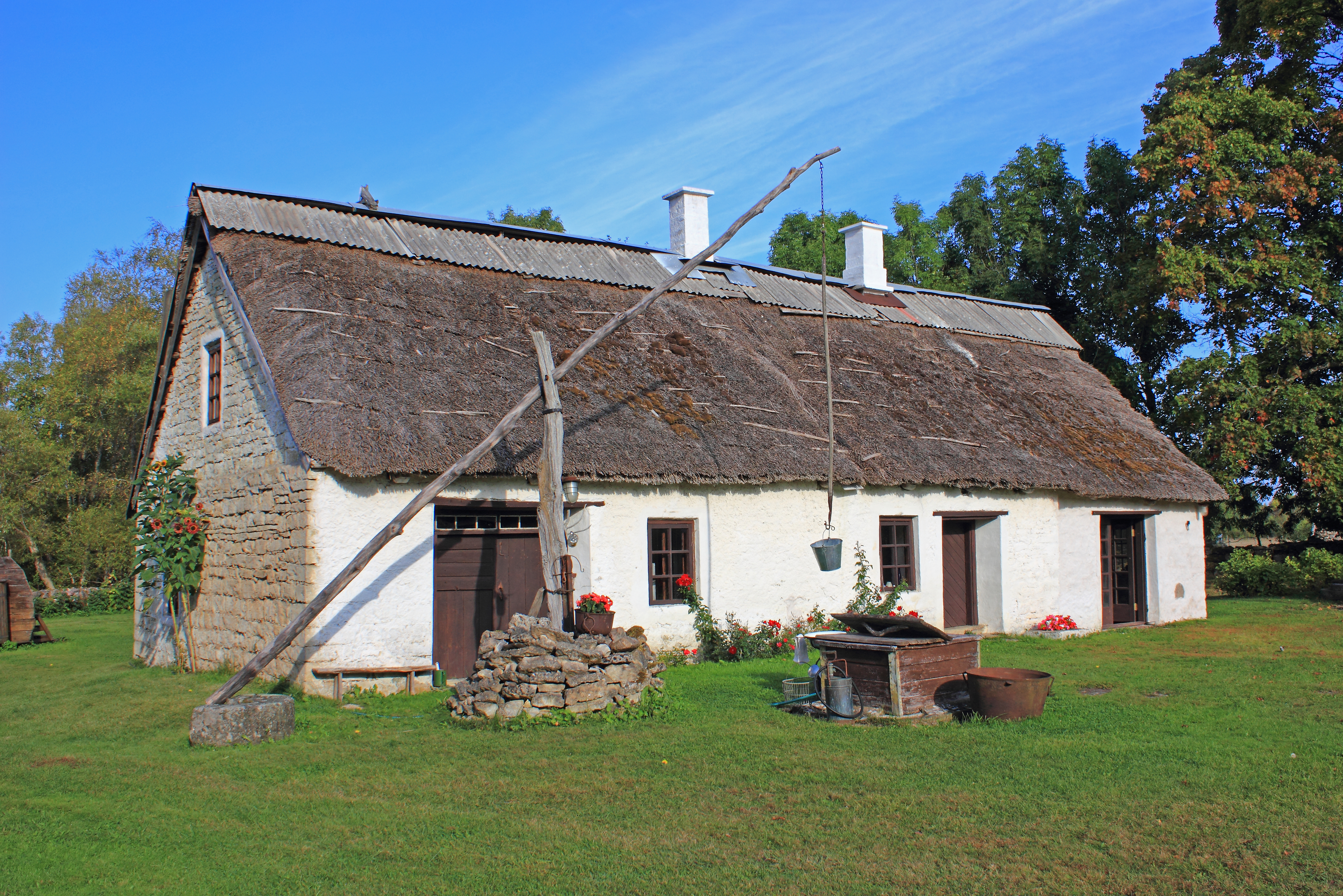
- Old farmhouse in Järveküla

- Location within Estonia
- Coordinates: 58°34′25″N 22°49′36″E
- Country: Estonia
- County: Saare County
- Parish: Saaremaa Parish

Population (2007)
  - Total: 13
- Time zone: UTC+2 (EET)
  - Summer (DST): UTC+3 (EEST)

Järveküla is a village in Saaremaa Parish, Saare County in western Estonia.

Before the administrative reform in 2017, the village was in Orissaare Parish.

In 2007, 13 people lived in the village.
