= Orissaare Parish =

Former municipality of Estonia

Coordinates: 58°33′35″N 23°05′35″E

Orissaare Parish Orissaare vald
- Former municipality of Estonia
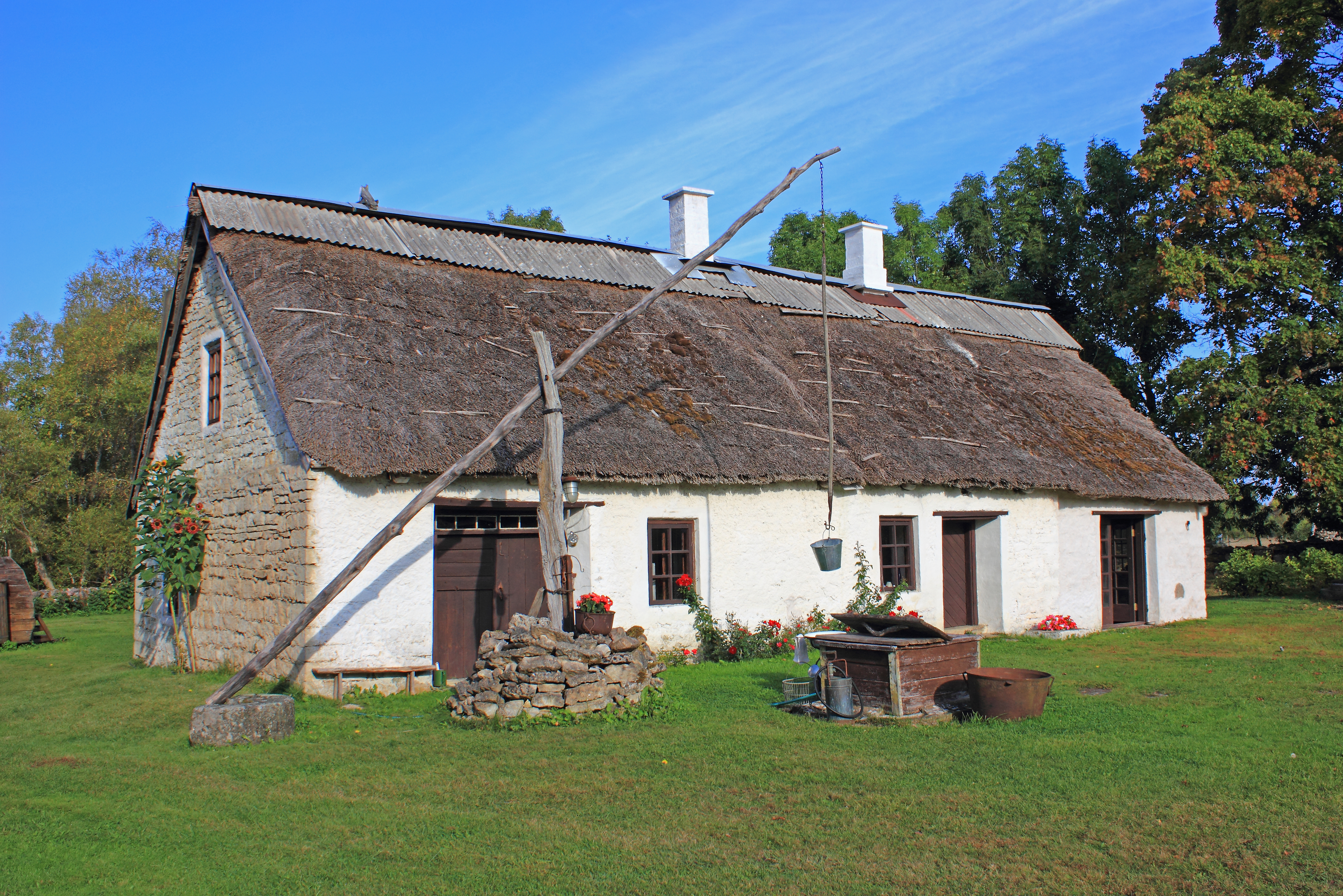
- Farmhouse in Järveküla

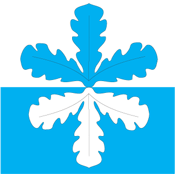
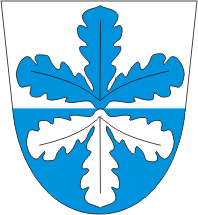
- Flag Coat of arms

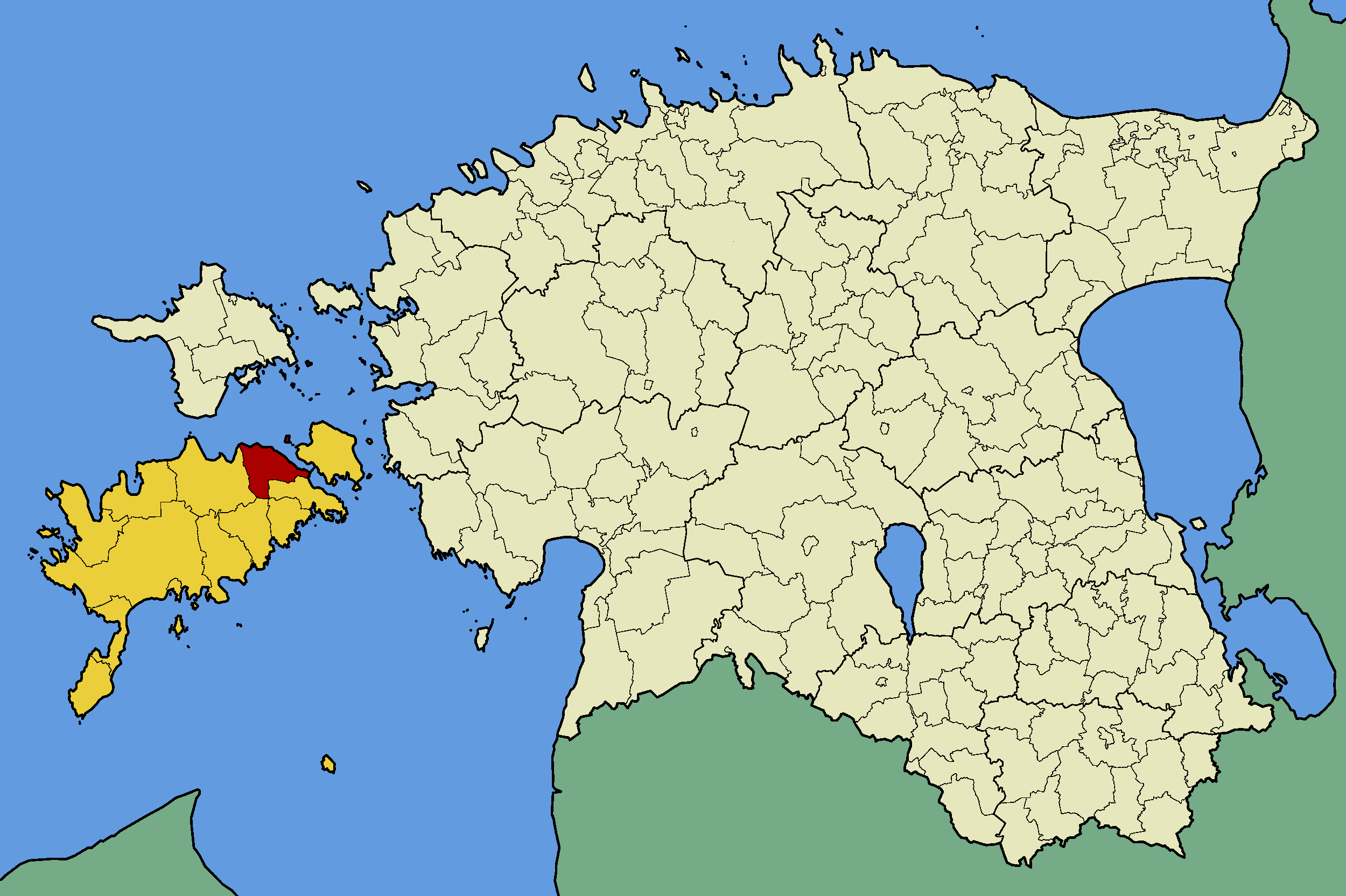
- Orissaare Parish within Saare County.
- Country: Estonia
- County: Saare County
- Administrative centre: Orissaare

Area
  - Total: 163.02 km^{2} (62.94 sq mi)

Population (01.01.2007)
  - Total: 2,116
  - Density: 12.98/km^{2} (33.62/sq mi)
- Website: www.orissaare.ee

Orissaare Parish was municipality in Saare County, Estonia. The municipality had a population of 2,116 (as of 1 January 2007) and covered an area of 163.02 km².

During the administrative-territorial reform in 2017, all 12 municipalities on the island Saaremaa were merged into a single municipality – Saaremaa Parish.

== Settlements ==
Small borough

Orissaare

Villages

Ariste - Arju - Haapsu - Hindu - Imavere - Jaani - Järveküla - Kalma - Kareda - Kavandi - Kõinastu - Kuninguste - Laheküla - Liigalaskma - Liiva - Maasi - Mäeküla - Mehama - Ööriku - Orinõmme - Põripõllu - Pulli - Randküla - Rannaküla - Raugu - Saikla - Salu - Suur-Pahila - Suur-Rahula - Taaliku - Tagavere - Tumala - Väike-Pahila - Väike-Rahula - Väljaküla - Võhma

== Gallery ==
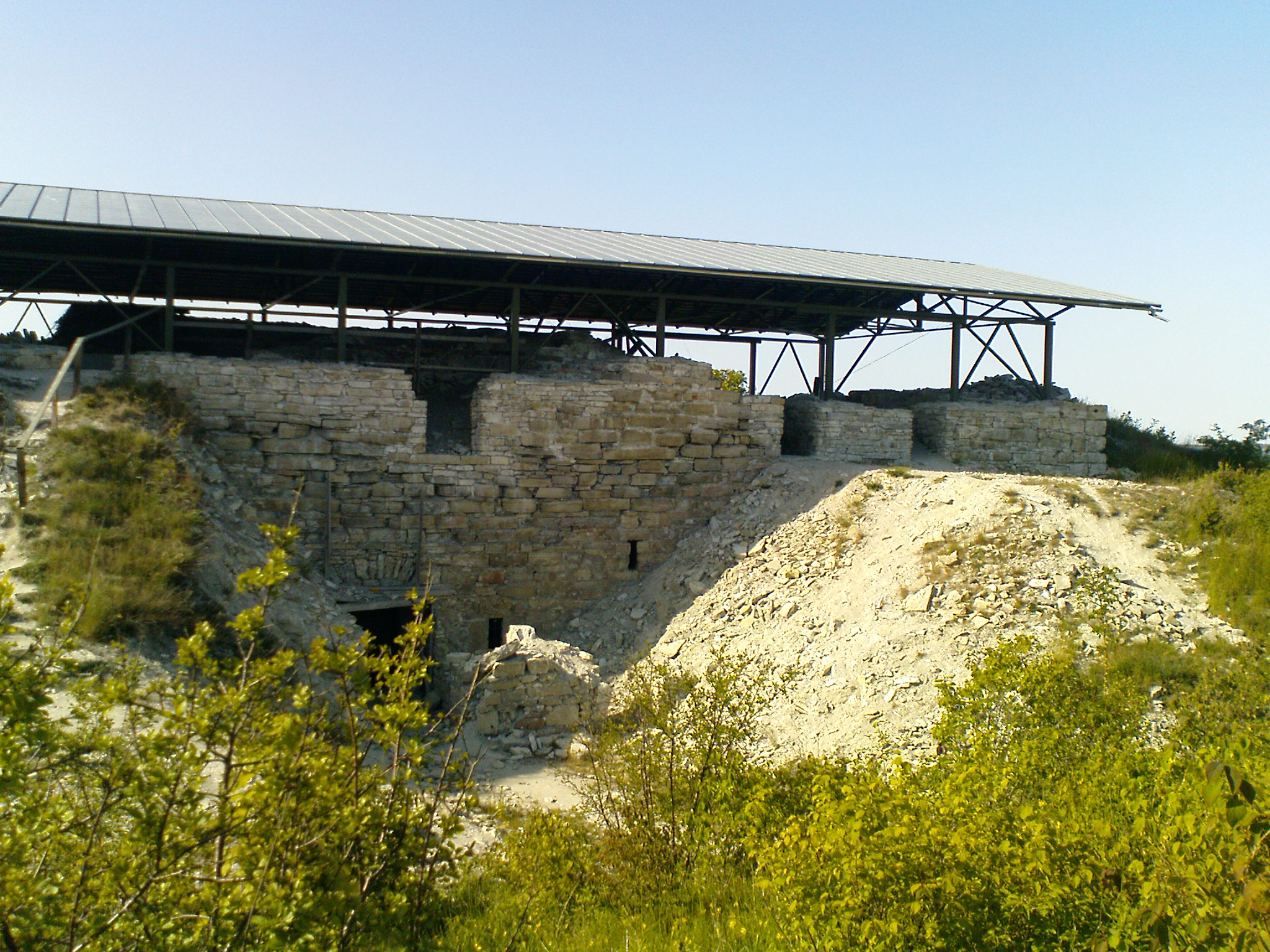
Ruins of Maasilinna Castle

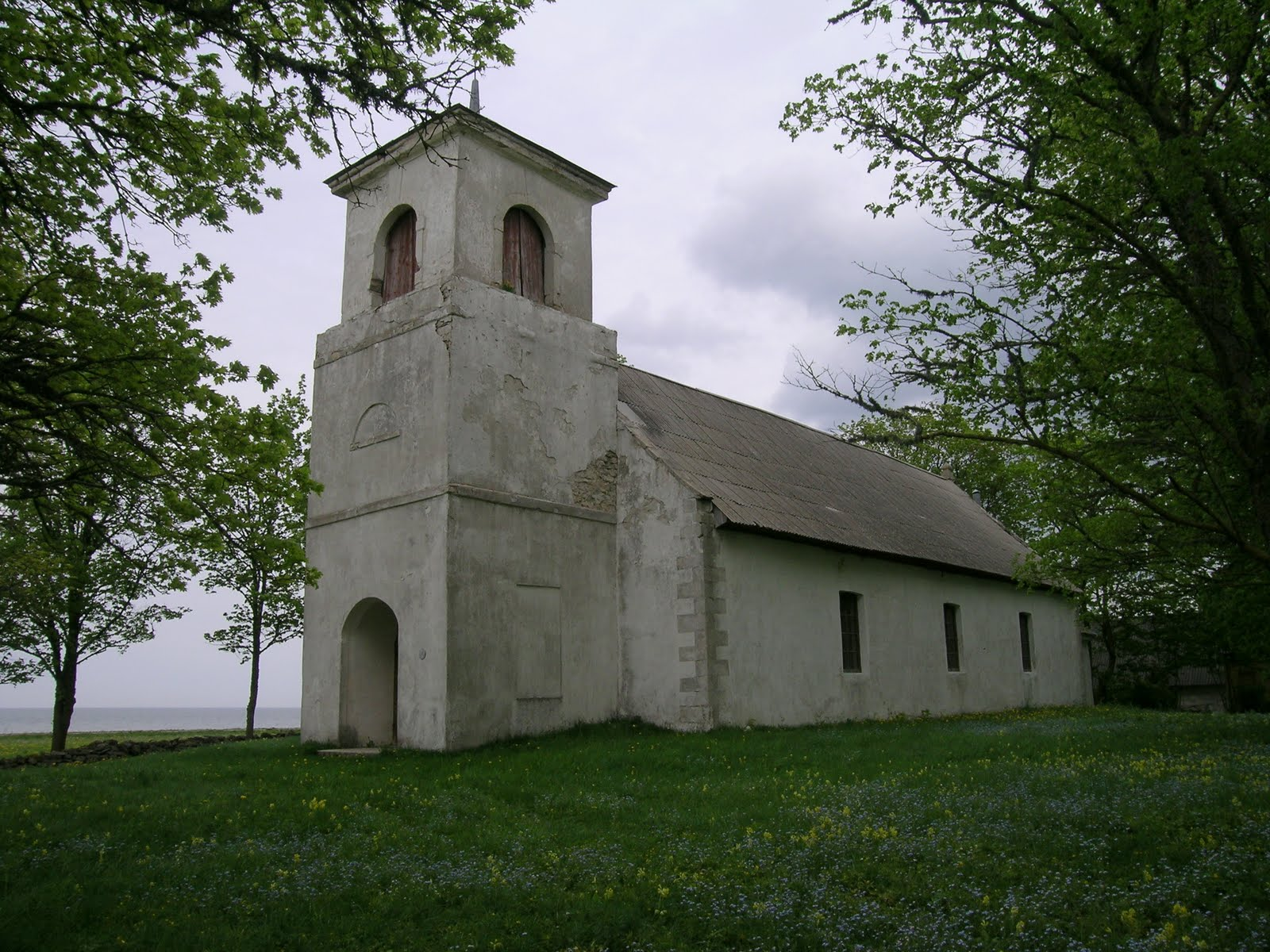
Saaremaa St. John's church in Jaani

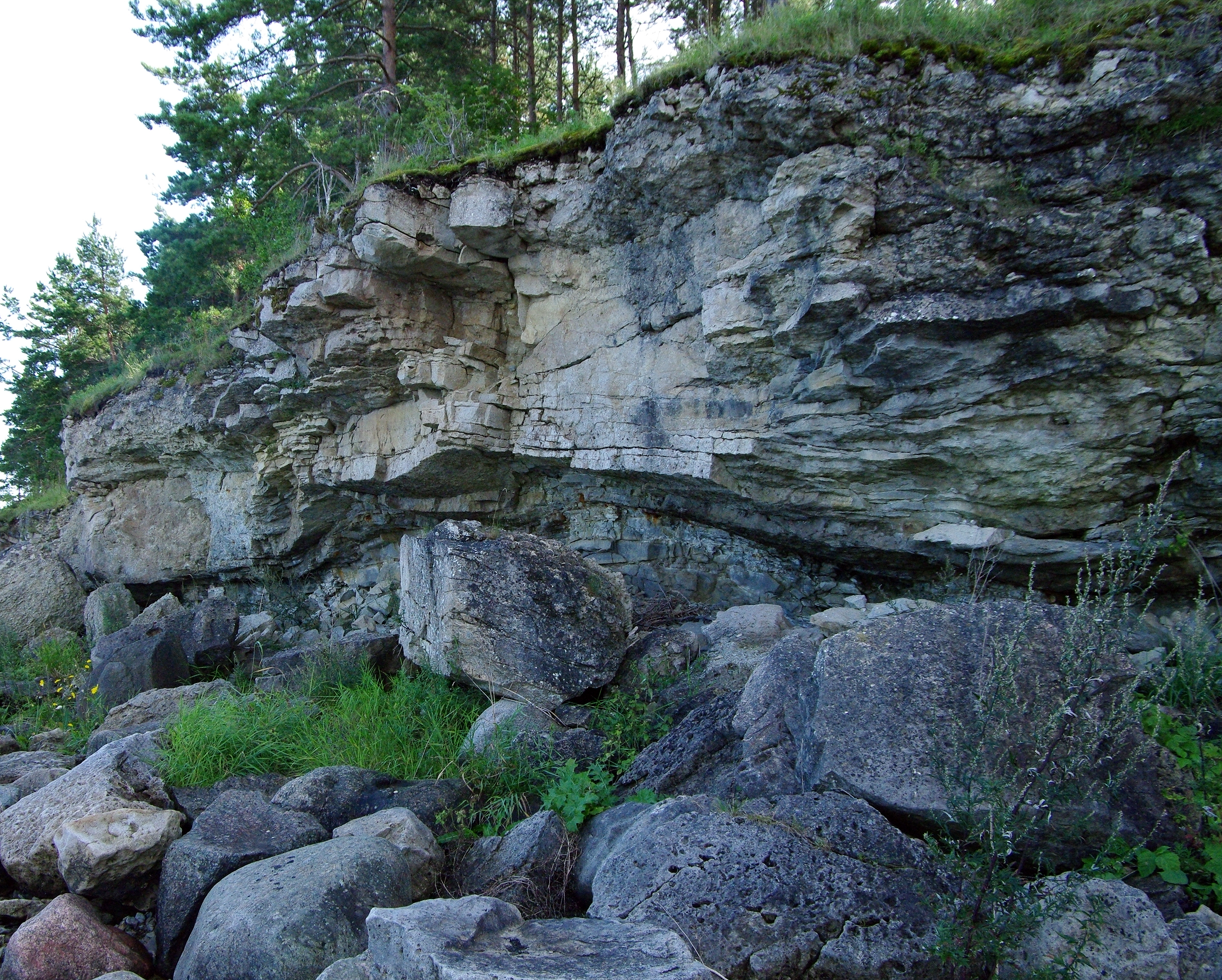
Pulli cliff

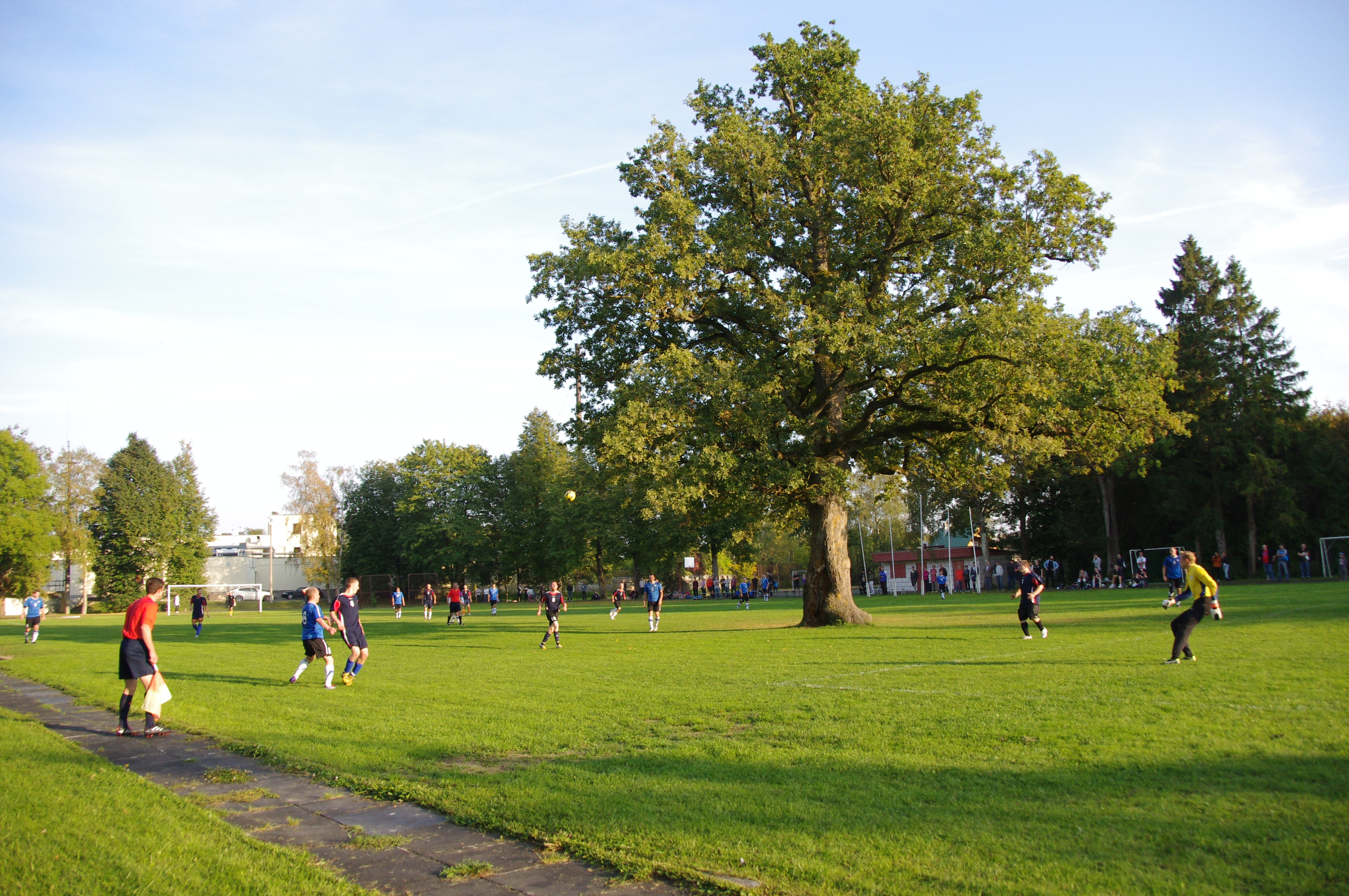
Orissaare stadium oak, the European Tree of the Year 2015.

== See also ==
- Municipalities of Estonia
