= Ando Keskküla =

Estonian painter and video artist (1950–2008)

- Born: March 24, 1950; Pöide, then part of Estonian SSR, Soviet Union
- Died: March 29, 2008 (aged 58)
- Occupations: Painter and video artist
- Spouse: Sirje Helme

Ando Keskküla (1989)

Ando Keskküla (March 24, 1950 – March 29, 2008) was an Estonian painter and video artist.

== Early life and education ==
Ando Keskküla was born in Pöide, Estonia. He attended Tallinn Grade School No. 34 and Tallinn Secondary School No. 46, where he graduated in 1968. He graduated from the Estonian State Institute of Arts as a designer (specializing in industrial art) in 1973.

== Career ==
Keskküla was the chairman of the Estonian Artists' Association from 1989 to 1992 and the chancellor of the Estonian Academy of Arts from 1995 to 2004.

== Awards and recognitions ==
- 1985: Honored Artist of the Estonian SSR
- 2000: Estonian State Cultural Award
- 2000: Cultural Endowment of Estonia Annual Award for Fine and Applied Arts: solo exhibition Rituaalide mehaanika (Mechanics of Rituals) at the Tallinn Art Hall and the video project Kuidas eestimaalane elab (How an Estonian Lives)
- 2001: Order of the White Star, 4th class
