= Haapsu =

Village in Estonia

- Village
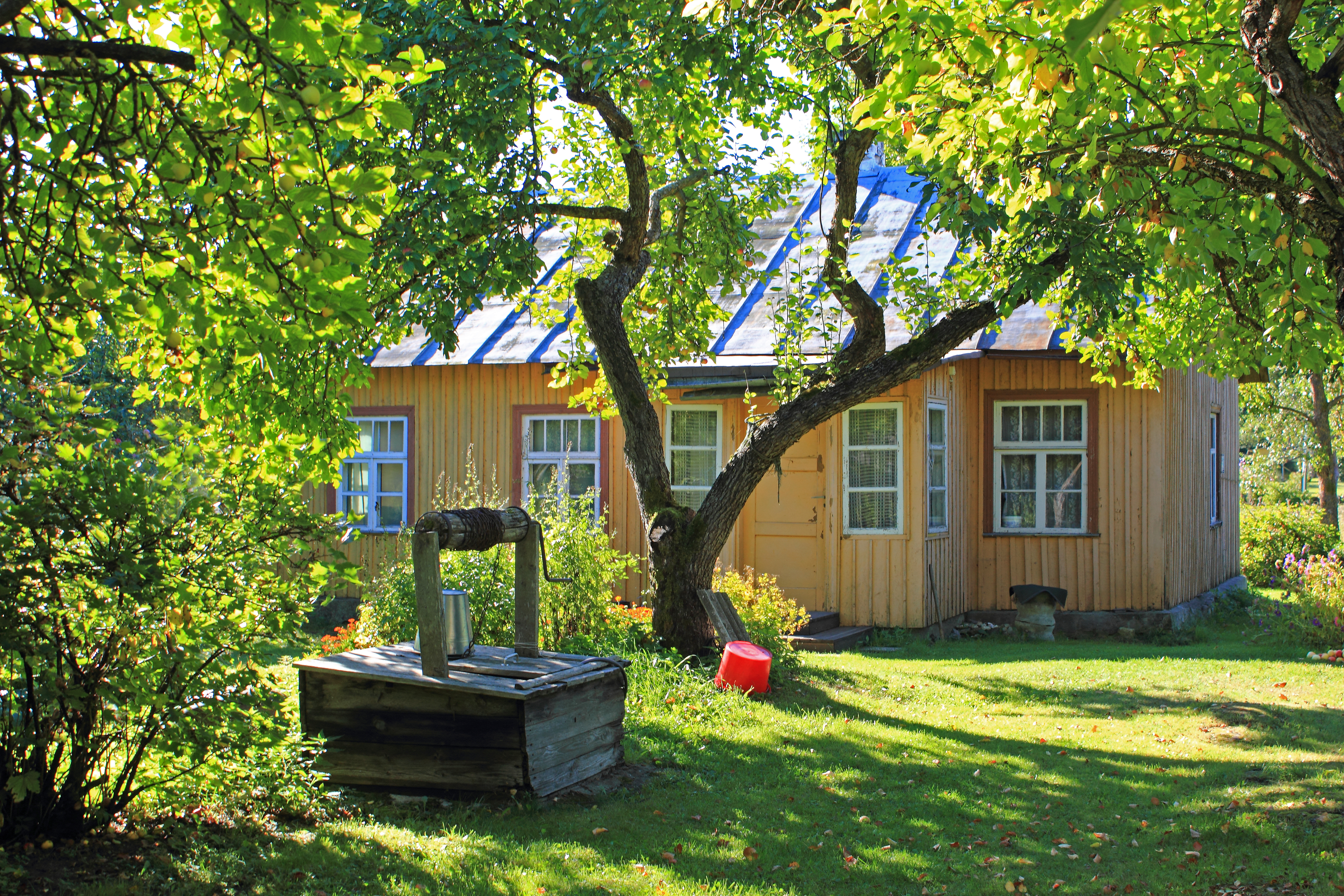
- A cottage in Haapsu village

- Location within Estonia
- Coordinates: 58°36′41″N 22°55′44″E
- Country: Estonia
- County: Saare County
- Parish: Saaremaa Parish
- Time zone: UTC+2 (EET)
  - Summer (DST): UTC+3 (EEST)

Haapsu is a village in Saaremaa Parish, Saare County in western Estonia.

Before the administrative reform in 2017, the village was in Orissaare Parish.
