= Väike-Rahula =

Village in Estonia

Coordinates: 58°32′50″N 22°59′30″E

- Village
- Interactive map of Väike-Rahula
- Country: Estonia
- County: Saare County
- Parish: Saaremaa Parish
- Time zone: UTC+2 (EET)
  - Summer (DST): UTC+3 (EEST)

Väike-Rahula is a village in Saaremaa Parish, Saare County in western Estonia.

Before the 2017 Estonian administrative reform, the village was in Orissaare Parish.
