= Jaani, Estonia =

Village in Estonia

Jaani
- Village
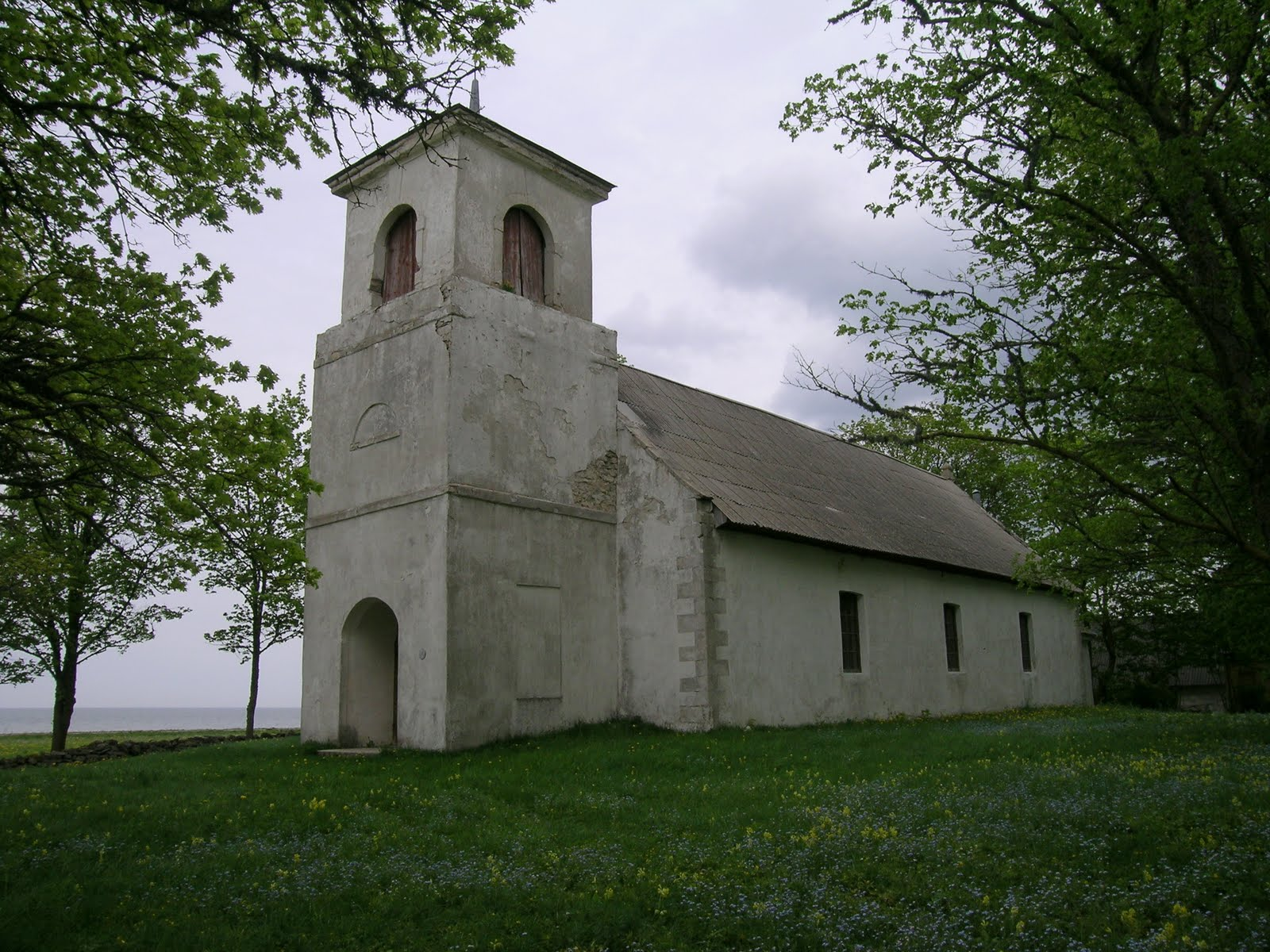
- Saaremaa St. John's church in Jaani.

- Location within Estonia
- Coordinates: 58°36′51″N 22°54′40″E
- Country: Estonia
- County: Saare County
- Parish: Saaremaa Parish
- Time zone: UTC+2 (EET)
  - Summer (DST): UTC+3 (EEST)

Jaani is a village in Saaremaa Parish, Saare County in western Estonia.

Before the administrative reform in 2017, the village was in Orissaare Parish. 1026 people live in Jaani.
