= Väike-Pahila =

Village in Estonia

Coordinates: 58°33′N 22°51′E

- Village
- Interactive map of Väike-Pahila
- Country: Estonia
- County: Saare County
- Parish: Saaremaa Parish
- Time zone: UTC+2 (EET)
  - Summer (DST): UTC+3 (EEST)

Väike-Pahila is a village in Saaremaa Parish, Saare County in western Estonia.

Before the 2017 administrative reform in Estonia, the village was in Orissaare Parish.
