= Mehama, Saare County =

Village in Estonia

Mehama
- Village
- Location within Estonia
- Coordinates: 58°31′28″N 23°01′41″E
- Country: Estonia
- County: Saare County
- Parish: Saaremaa Parish
- Time zone: UTC+2 (EET)
  - Summer (DST): UTC+3 (EEST)

Mehama is a village in Saaremaa Parish, Saare County in western Estonia.

Before the administrative reform in 2017, the village was in Orissaare Parish.

== Population ==
According to http://citypopulation.de/en/estonia/saare/saaremaa/4855__mehama/, the population of Mehama is 31 as of the 31/12/2021 census.
