= Ööriku =

Village in Estonia

Coordinates: 58°35′N 22°56′E

- Village
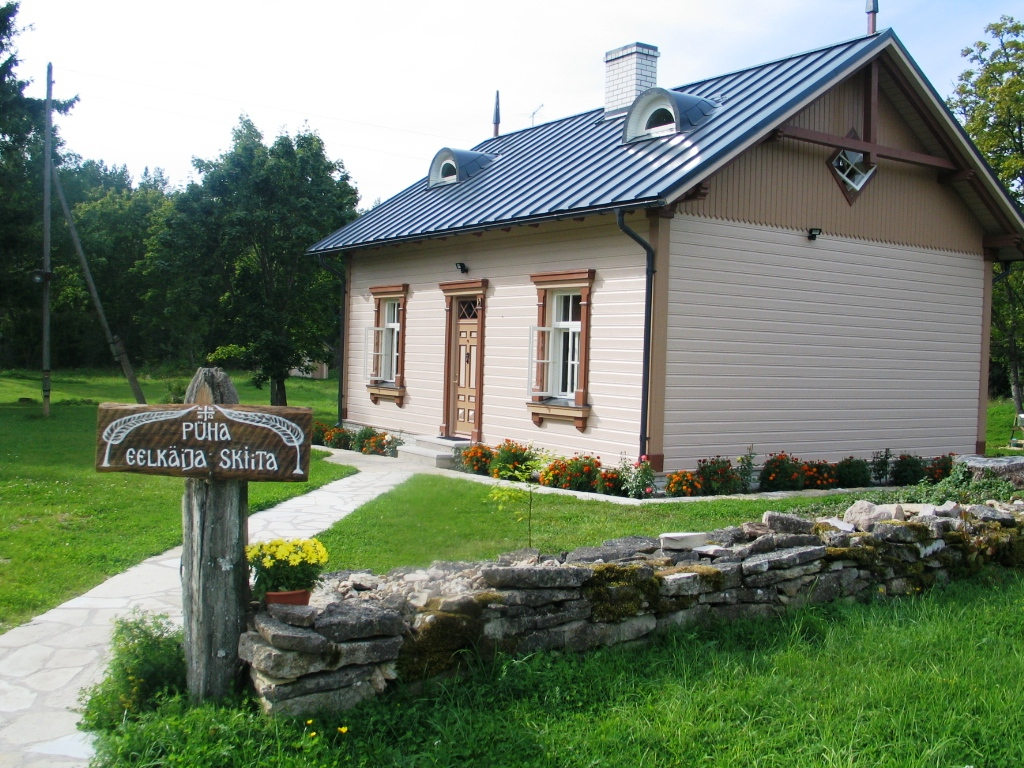
- Former Estonian Apostolic Orthodox Church nun's convent in Ööriku
- Interactive map of Ööriku
- Country: Estonia
- County: Saare County
- Parish: Saaremaa Parish
- Time zone: UTC+2 (EET)
  - Summer (DST): UTC+3 (EEST)

Ööriku is a village in Saaremaa Parish, Saare County in western Estonia.

Before the administrative reform in 2017, the village was in Orissaare Parish.

Former Estonian Apostolic Orthodox Church nun's convent is located in Ööriku.
