= Põripõllu =

Village in Estonia

Coordinates: 58°32′54″N 23°05′43″E

- Village
- Interactive map of Põripõllu
- Country: Estonia
- County: Saare County
- Parish: Saaremaa Parish
- Time zone: UTC+2 (EET)
  - Summer (DST): UTC+3 (EEST)

Põripõllu is a village in Saaremaa Parish, Saare County in western Estonia.

== Name ==
Põripõllu was named in 1997; earlier, the village was known as Orissaare asundus (lit. 'Orissaare settlement') or Orissaare küla (lit. 'Orissaare village'). It is named after a field called Põripõld (genitive: Põripõllu, lit. 'Põri field'), originally a meadow attested in 1645 as Pörrisemah, Pörrißi, Porriß, and Perrißemah. The first part of the name comes from the Põri farm, which is located on the border of the village with neighboring Reina. The name of the farm is based on the now-obsolete noun põri 'mud, mire' or derived from põrine 'scythe with a cracked blade'.

== History ==
Before the administrative reform in 2017, the village was in Orissaare Parish.
