= Kirderanna =

Village in Estonia

Coordinates: 58°37′07″N 22°51′56″E

- Village
- Interactive map of Kirderanna
- Country: Estonia
- County: Saare County
- Parish: Saaremaa Parish
- Time zone: UTC+2 (EET)
  - Summer (DST): UTC+3 (EEST)

Kirderanna (Rannaküla until 2017) is a village in Saaremaa Parish, Saare County in western Estonia.

Before the administrative reform in 2017, the village was in Orissaare Parish.
