= Pulli, Saare County =

Village in Estonia

Coordinates: 58°36′27″N 22°57′23″E

Pulli
- Village
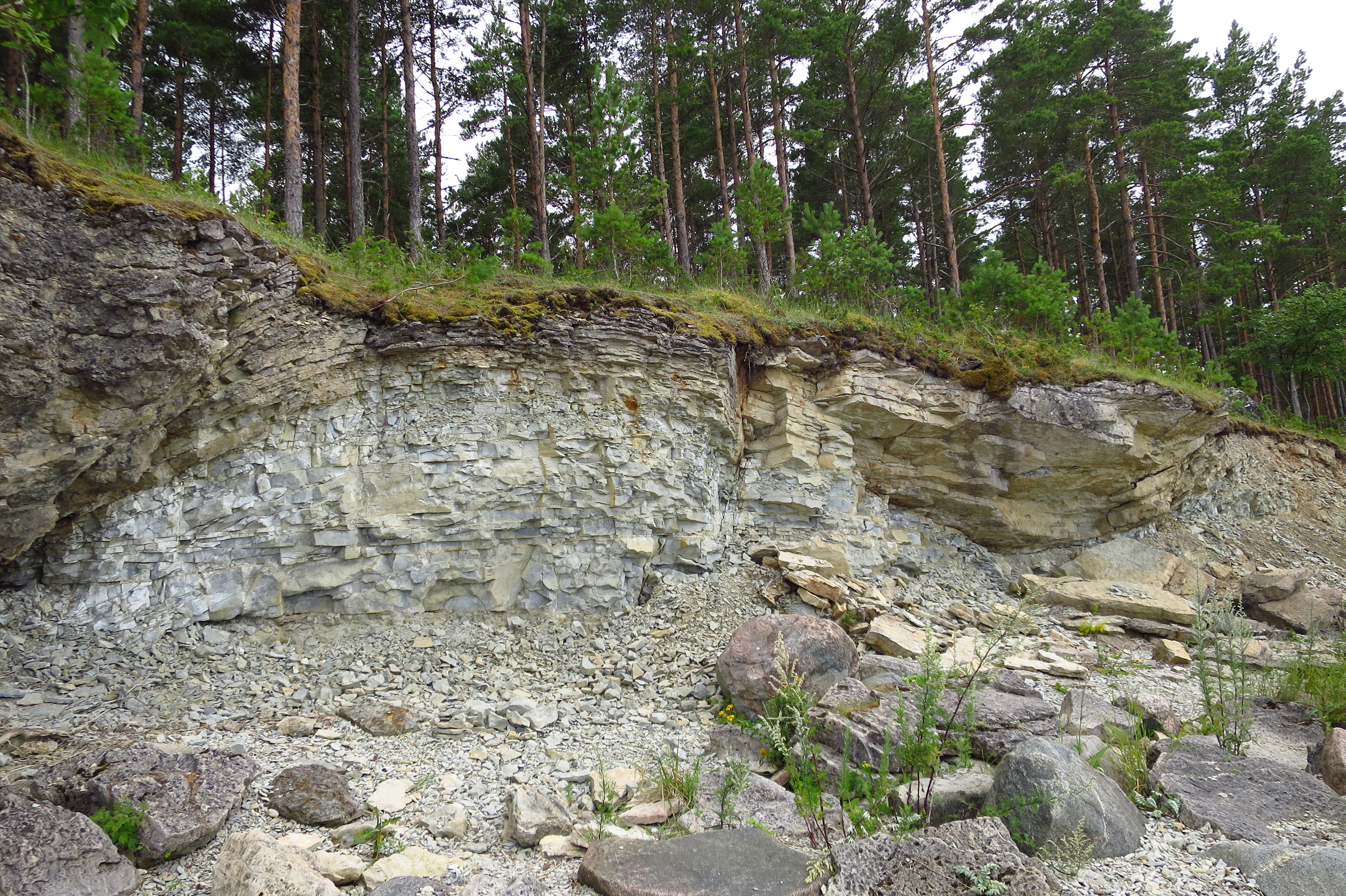
- The Pulli bank, a limestone cliff, in Pulli
- Interactive map of Pulli
- Country: Estonia
- County: Saare County
- Parish: Saaremaa Parish
- Time zone: UTC+2 (EET)
  - Summer (DST): UTC+3 (EEST)

Pulli is a village in Saaremaa Parish, Saare County in western Estonia.

Before the administrative reform in 2017, the village was in Orissaare Parish.
