= Imavere, Saare County =

Village in Estonia

Imavere
- Village
- Location within Estonia
- Coordinates: 58°29′58″N 22°53′20″E
- Country: Estonia
- County: Saare County
- Parish: Saaremaa Parish
- Time zone: UTC+2 (EET)
  - Summer (DST): UTC+3 (EEST)

Imavere is a village in Saaremaa Parish, Saare County in western Estonia.

Before the administrative reform in 2017, the village was in Orissaare Parish.
