= Taaliku =

Village in Estonia

Coordinates: 58°35′N 22°57′E

- Village
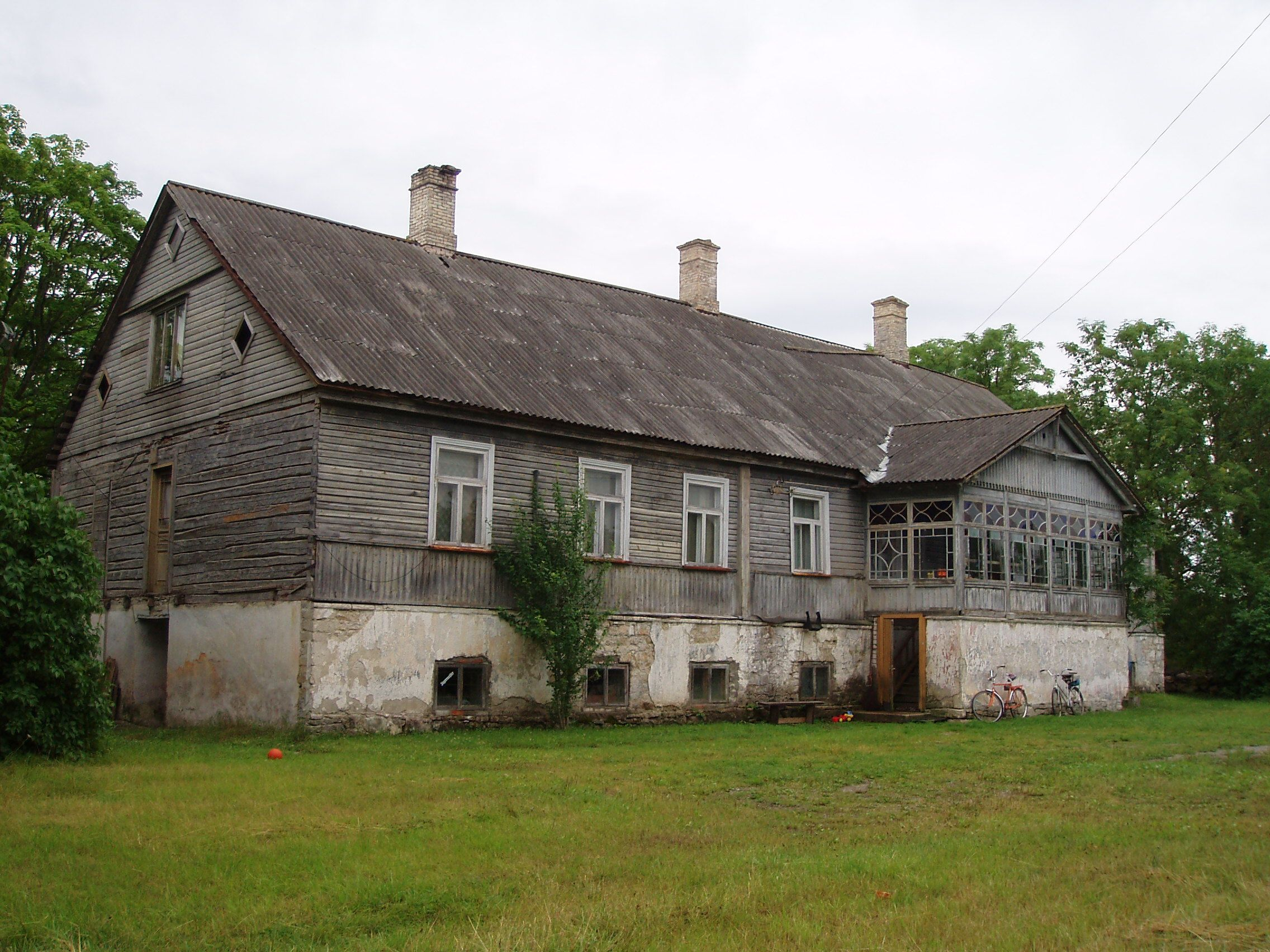
- Taaliku Manor, established in 1532
- Interactive map of Taaliku
- Country: Estonia
- County: Saare County
- Parish: Saaremaa Parish
- Time zone: UTC+2 (EET)
  - Summer (DST): UTC+3 (EEST)

Taaliku is a village in Saaremaa Parish, Saare County in western Estonia.

Before the administrative reform in 2017, the village was in Orissaare Parish.
