= Pöide =

Village in Estonia

Coordinates: 58°31′N 23°04′E

- Village
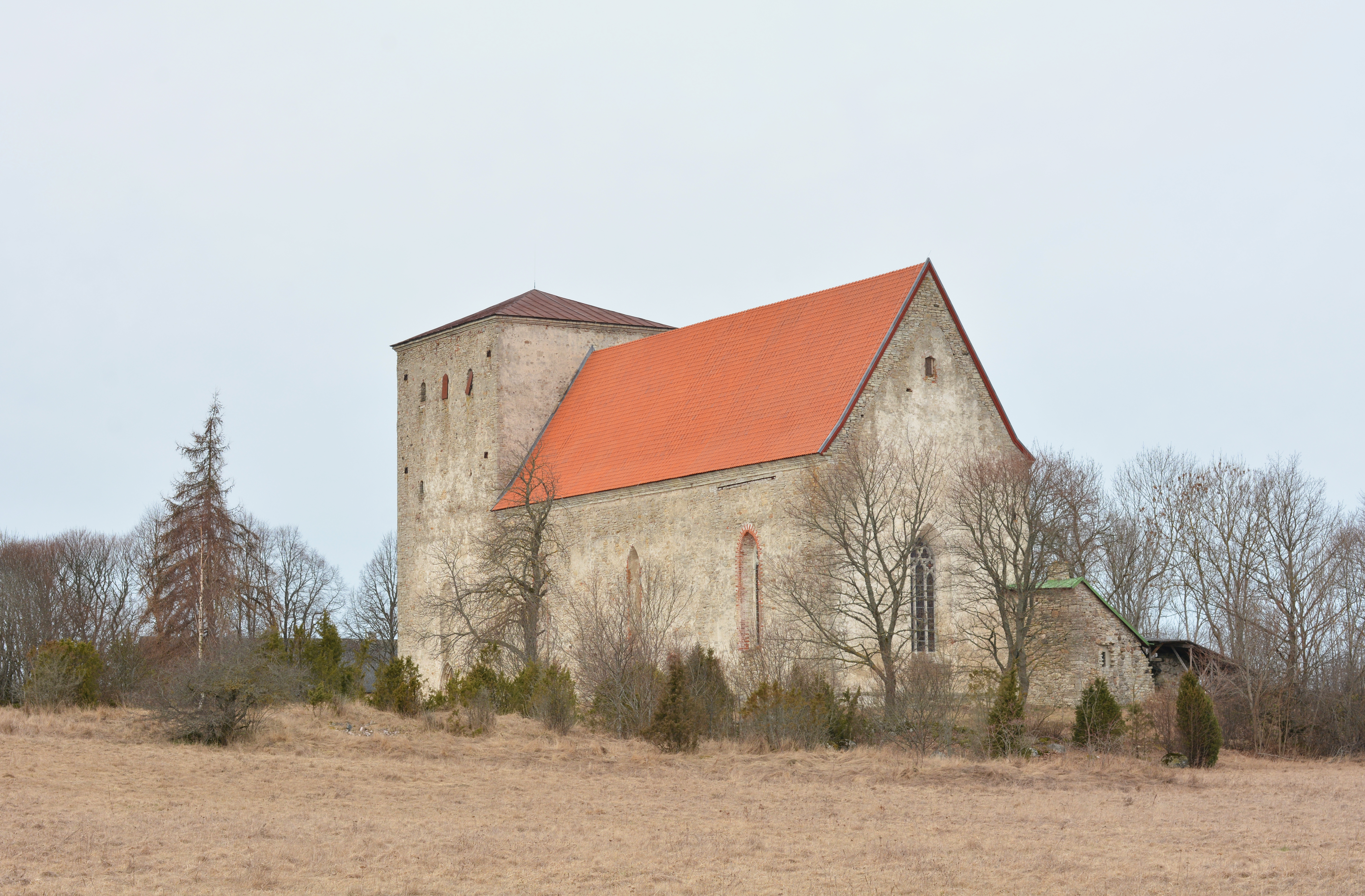
- Pöide Church
- Interactive map of Pöide
- Country: Estonia
- County: Saare County
- Parish: Saaremaa Parish
- Time zone: UTC+2 (EET)
  - Summer (DST): UTC+3 (EEST)

Pöide (German: Peude) is a village in Saaremaa Parish, Saare County, on the eastern part of Saaremaa Island, Estonia.

Before the administrative reform in 2017, the village was in Pöide Parish.

== Notable people ==
Notable people that were born or lived in Pöide include the following:

- Ando Keskküla (1950–2008), painter and video artist, born in Pöide
- Oskar Köster (1890–1941), politician, born in Pöide
