= Are, Saare County =

Village in Estonia

Are
- Village
- Location within Estonia
- Coordinates: 58°30′00″N 23°00′44″E
- Country: Estonia
- County: Saare County
- Parish: Saaremaa Parish
- Time zone: UTC+2 (EET)
  - Summer (DST): UTC+3 (EEST)

Are is a village in Saaremaa Parish, Saare County, in western Estonia.

Before the administrative reform in 2017, the village was in Pöide Parish.
