= Välta =

Village in Estonia

Coordinates: 58°29′N 23°09′E

- Village
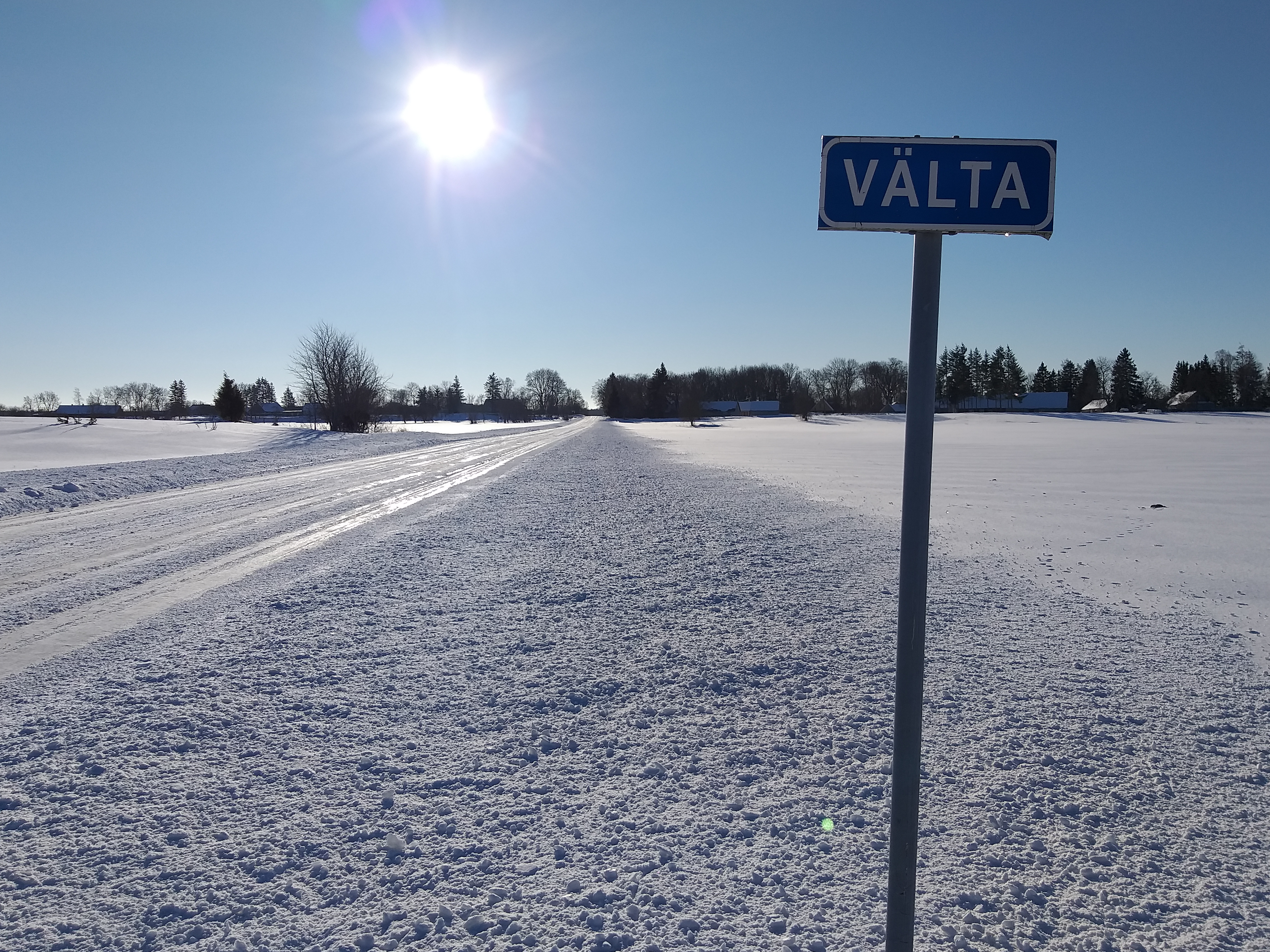
- Interactive map of Välta
- Country: Estonia
- County: Saare
- Parish: Saaremaa
- Time zone: UTC+2 (EET)
  - Summer (DST): UTC+3 (EEST)

Välta is a village in Saaremaa Parish, Saare County in western Estonia.

Before the administrative reform in 2017, the village was in Pöide Parish.
