= Levala, Saare County =

Village in Estonia

Levala
- Village
- Location within Estonia Location within Europe
- Coordinates: 58°30′45″N 23°02′30″E
- Country: Estonia
- County: Saare County
- Parish: Saaremaa Parish

Population (2011)
  - Total: 40
- Time zone: UTC+2 (EET)
  - Summer (DST): UTC+3 (EEST)

Levala is a village in Saaremaa Parish, Saare County in western Estonia.

Before the administrative reform in 2017, the village was in Pöide Parish.
