= Iruste =

Village in Estonia

- Village
- Location in Estonia
- Coordinates: 58°30′40″N 23°1′24″E
- Country: Estonia
- County: Saare County
- Parish: Saaremaa Parish
- Time zone: UTC+2 (EET)
  - Summer (DST): UTC+3 (EEST)

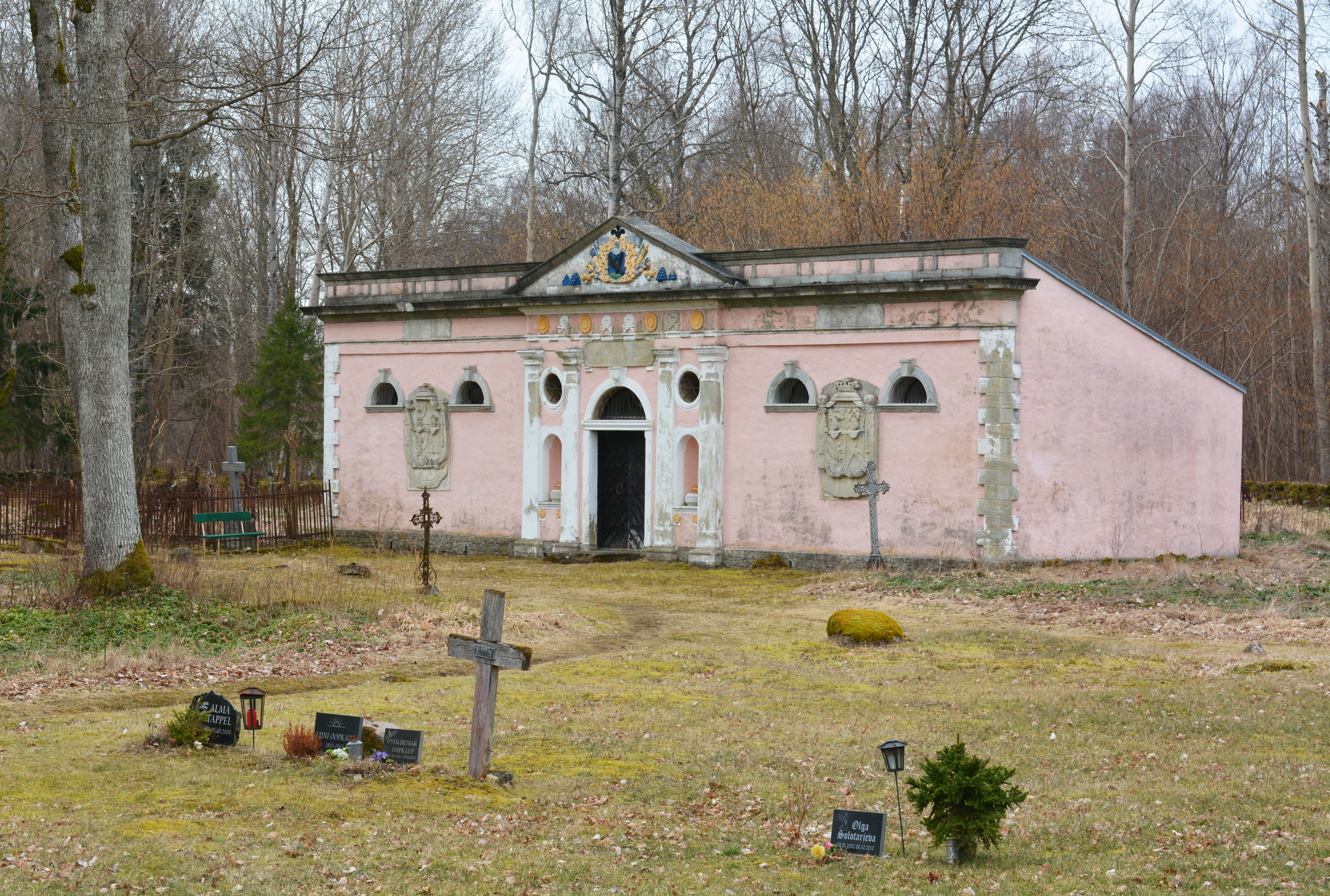
G. W. von Aderkas chapel in Iruste.

Iruste is a village in Saaremaa Parish, Saare County in western Estonia.

Before the administrative reform in 2017, the village was in Pöide Parish.
