= Kakuna =

Kakuna may refer to:

- Kakuna (Pokémon), a generation I Pokémon
- Kakuna, Estonia, a village in Saaremaa
- Kakuna (planthopper), a genus in the family Delphacidae
