= Reina, Estonia =

Village in Estonia

Coordinates: 58°31′N 23°07′E

Reina
- Village
- Interactive map of Reina
- Country: Estonia
- County: Saare County
- Parish: Saaremaa Parish
- Time zone: UTC+2 (EET)
  - Summer (DST): UTC+3 (EEST)

Reina is a village in Saaremaa Parish, Saare County in western Estonia.

Before the administrative reform in 2017, the village was in Pöide Parish.

== Notable people ==
Notable people that were born or lived in Reina:

- Juhan Peegel (1919–2007), journalist, linguist and writer.
