= Juhan Peegel =

Estonian journalist, linguist and writer

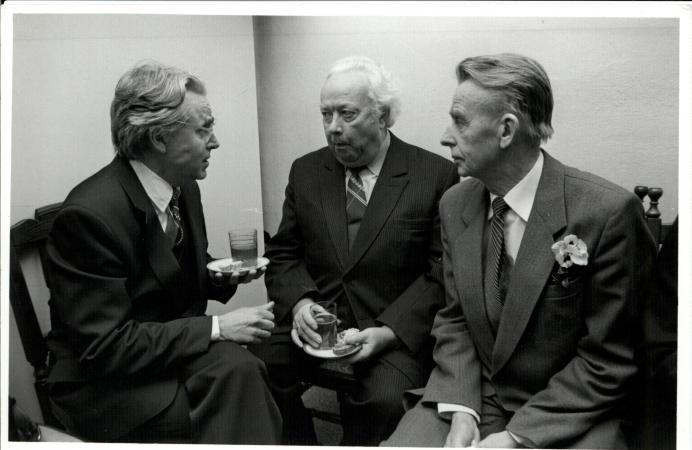
- Peegel (center) in 1985
- Born: 19 May 1919; Reina, Estonia
- Died: 6 November 2007 (aged 88); Tartu, Estonia

Academic background
- Education: Tartu University

Juhan Peegel ([ˈjuhɑn ˈpeːɡel], |19 May 1919 Reina, Saare County, Estonia – 6 November 2007) was an Estonian journalist, linguist and writer.

From 1941 to 1945, he served as a soldier in the 8th Estonian Rifle Corps.

In 1951, he graduated from Tartu University.

From 1947 to 1952, he worked at the editorial office of the newspaper Edasi.

He began lecturing at Tartu University in 1952.

In 1977, he became a member of Estonian Academy of Sciences.

== Awards ==
- 1996 Wiedemann language award
- 1993 and 1998 Republic of Estonia science prize
- 1999 Republic of Estonia science life work prize
