= Neemi =

Village in Estonia

Coordinates: 58°29′N 23°08′E

- Village
- Interactive map of Neemi
- Country: Estonia
- County: Saare County
- Parish: Saaremaa Parish
- Time zone: UTC+2 (EET)
  - Summer (DST): UTC+3 (EEST)

Drone video of Neemi village, dendrarium and labyrinth in August 2021

Neemi is a village in Saaremaa Parish, Saare County in western Estonia.

Before the administrative reform in 2017, the village was in Pöide Parish.

There's a dendrarium in Neemi that was established in 1925 by the village smith Mihkel Rand (1871–1958).

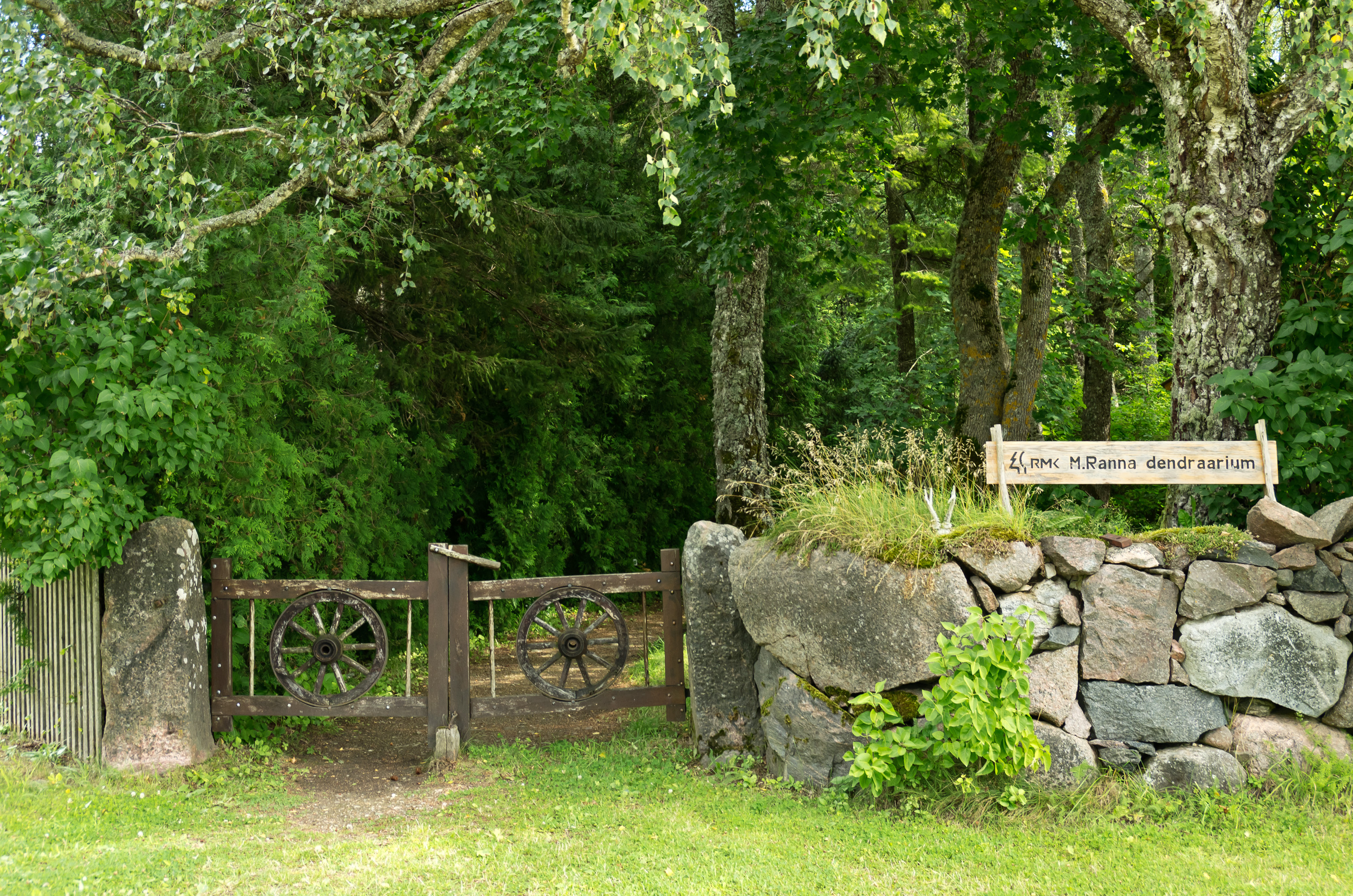
The gate of Mihkel Rand's dendrarium.

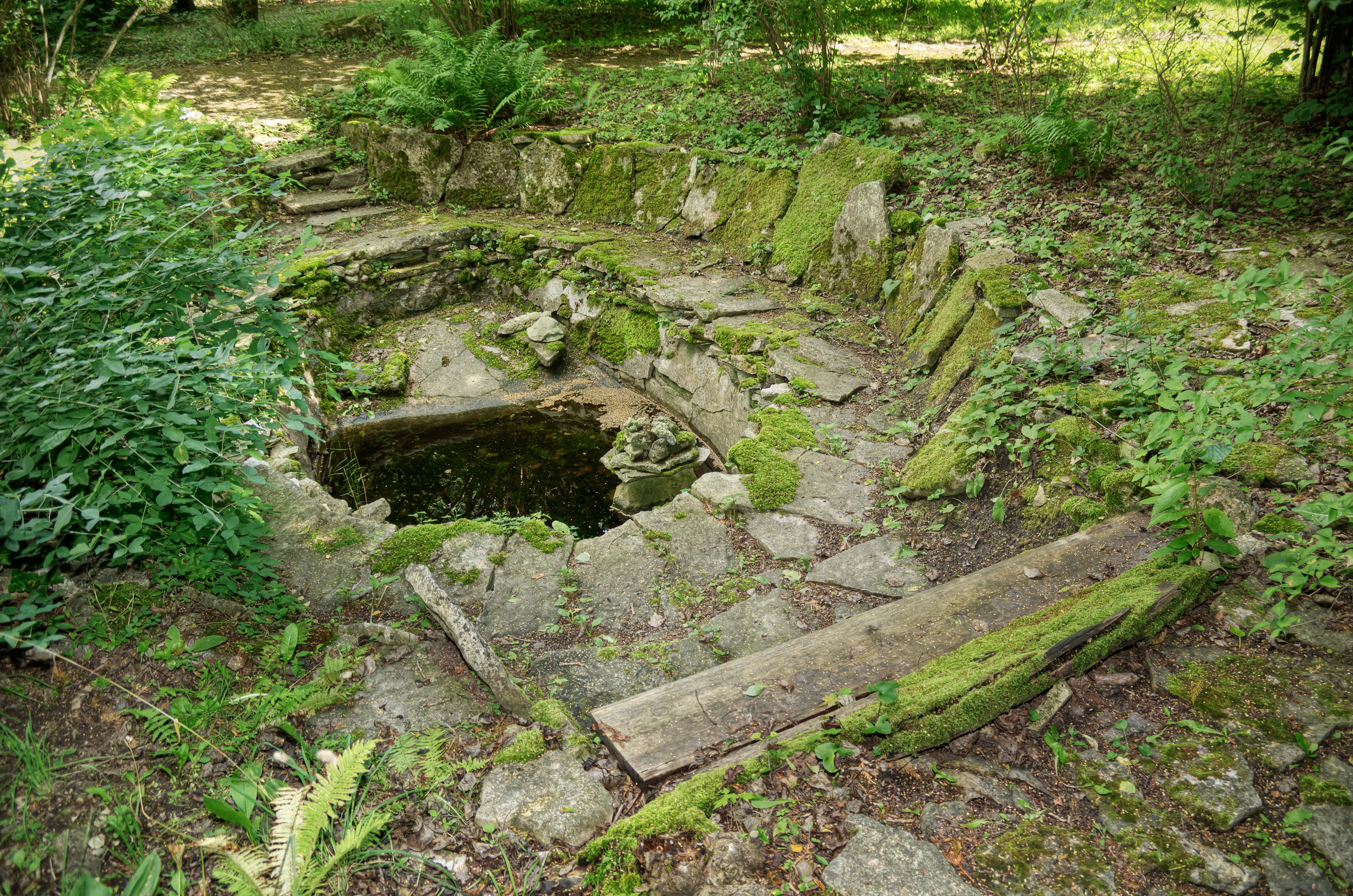
Pool in the dendrarium
