= Nenu =

Nenu may refer to:

- Nenu (film), a 2004 Indian Telugu-language film
- Nenu, Estonia
- Northeast Normal University, China
