= Leisi village =

Village in Estonia

Coordinates: 58°28′55″N 23°12′40″E

Leisi
- Village
- Interactive map of Leisi
- Country: Estonia
- County: Saare County
- Parish: Saaremaa Parish

Area
  - Total: 3.265 km^{2} (1.261 sq mi)

Population (2011)
  - Total: 6
- Time zone: UTC+2 (EET)
  - Summer (DST): UTC+3 (EEST)

Leisi is a village in Saaremaa Parish, Saare County in western Estonia.

Before the administrative reform in 2017, the village was in Pöide Parish.
