= Tornimäe =

Village in Estonia

- Village
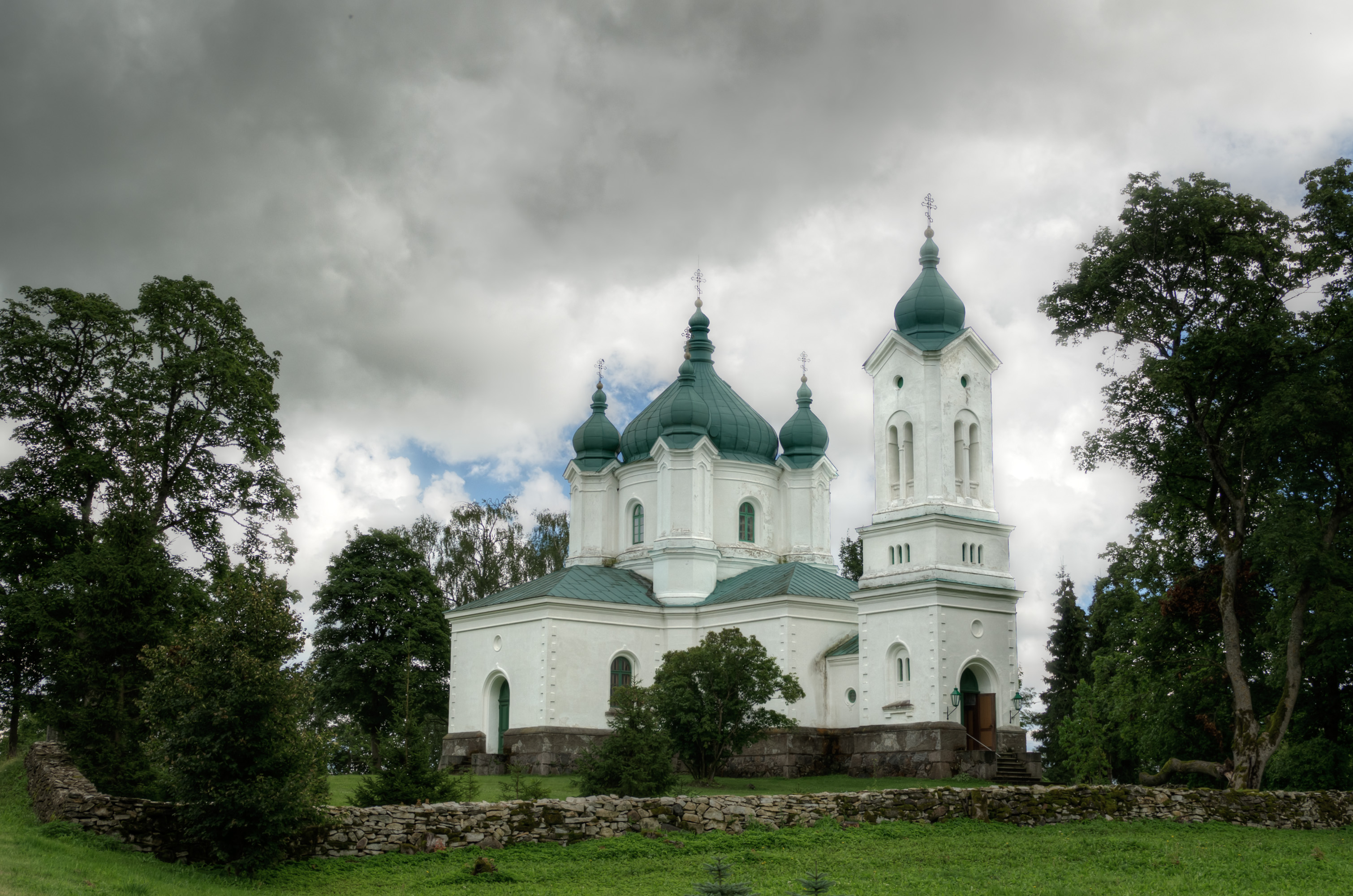
- Interactive map of Tornimäe
- Coordinates: 58°30′13″N 23°06′56″E
- Country: Estonia
- County: Saare County
- Parish: Saaremaa Parish
- Time zone: UTC+2 (EET)
  - Summer (DST): UTC+3 (EEST)

Tornimäe is a village in Saaremaa Parish, Saare County in western Estonia.

Before the administrative reform in 2017, the village was in Pöide Parish.

Tornimäe street and unofficial neighbourhood (literally "Tower Hill") in Tallinn, site of most high-rise buildings in Tallinn, is named after one of its local residents, who was from Tornimäe village in Saaremaa.
