= Pöide Parish =

Former municipality of Estonia

Coordinates: 58°30′44″N 23°03′32″E

Pöide Parish Pöide vald
- Municipality of Estonia
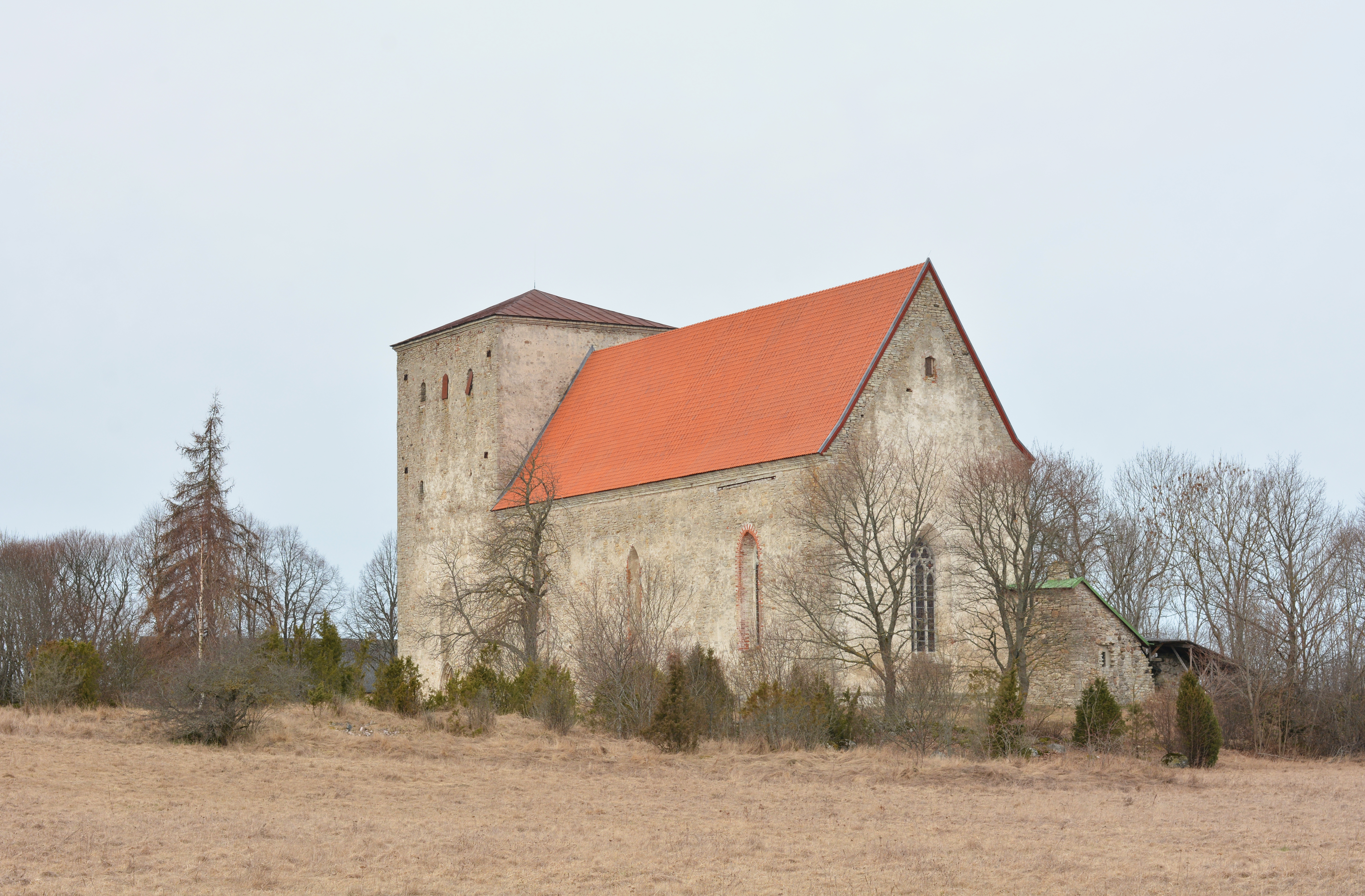
- Pöide church

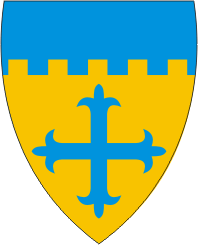
- Flag Coat of arms

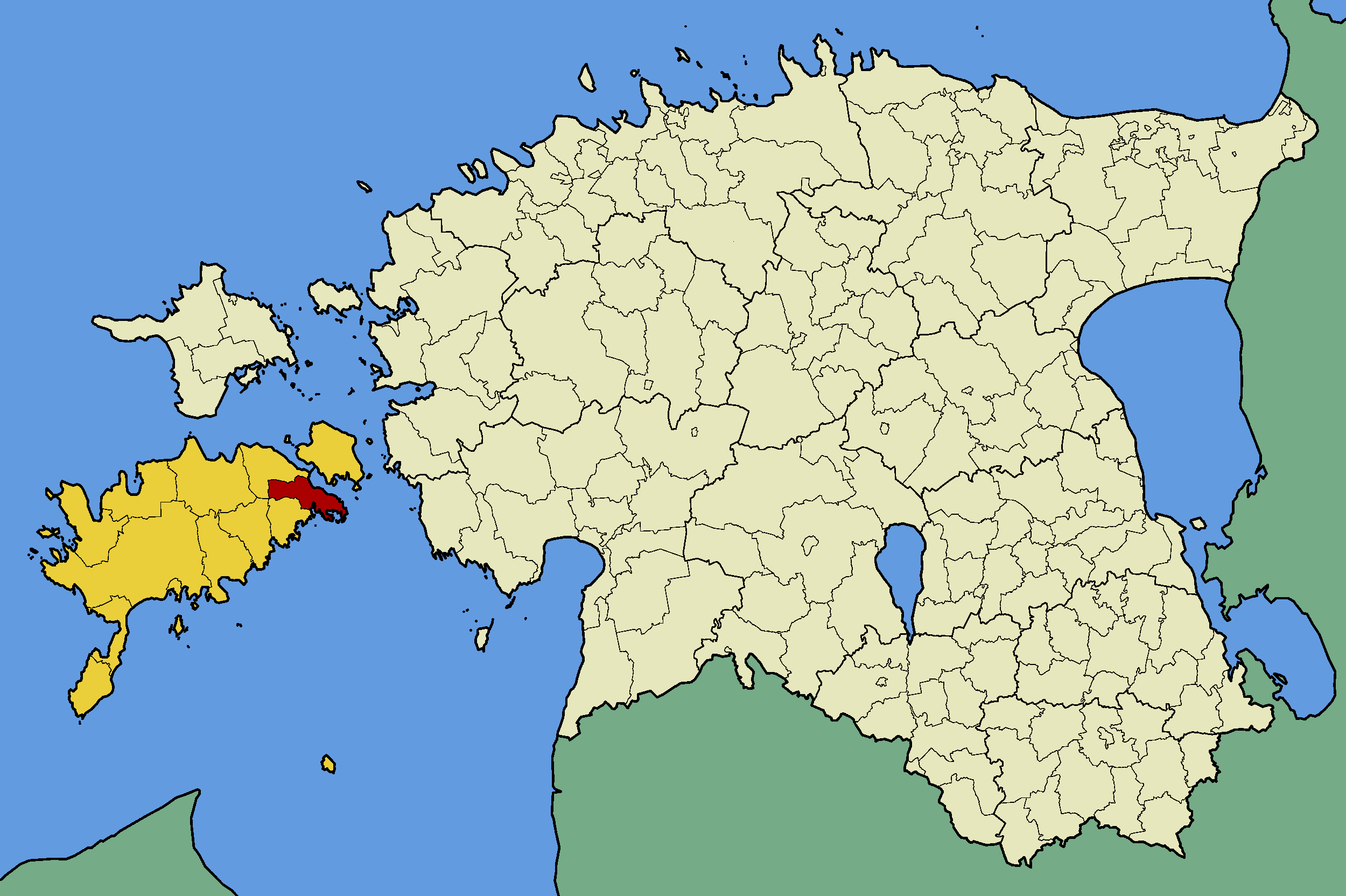
- Pöide Parish within Saare County.
- Country: Estonia
- County: Saare County
- Administrative centre: Tornimäe

Area
  - Total: 123.6 km^{2} (47.7 sq mi)

Population (01.01.2006)
  - Total: 953
  - Density: 7.71/km^{2} (20.0/sq mi)
- Website: www.saaremaa.ee/poide

Pöide Parish was a municipality in Saare County, Estonia. The municipality covered an area of 123.6 km^{2} (47.7 mi^{2}) and had a population of 953 (as of 1 January 2006).

During the administrative-territorial reform in 2017, all 12 municipalities on the island Saaremaa were merged into a single municipality – Saaremaa Parish.

== Villages ==
Ardla - Are - Iruste - Kahutsi - Kakuna - Kanissaare - Kärneri - Keskvere - Koigi - Kõrkvere - Kübassaare - Leisi - Levala - Metsara - Mui - Muraja - Neemi - Nenu - Oti - Puka - Pöide - Reina - Sundimetsa - Talila - Tornimäe - Ula - Unguma - Uuemõisa - Välta - Veere

== Pöide Church ==
Pöide Church is located in Pöide Parish. Pöide St. Mary's church dominates the surrounding low countryside. Due to its massiveness, it gives the impression of a fortress rather than a church. Indeed, its history is entwined with Saaremaa's battles and fortresses. After the conquest of Saaremaa in 1227, the eastern part of Saaremaa belonged to the Livonian Order, who built a fortress at Pöide as their headquarters during the second half of the 13th century. This fortress was destroyed by the Saarlanders during the wave of uprisings against the occupying forces that took place in Estonia and Saaremaa during St.George's Night Uprising of 1343. There was a chapel on the southern side of the fortress, and the walls of this chapel form the central part of Pöide Church. The church was last burnt and its interior completely destroyed during World War II. It is slowly being restored.

== Manors ==
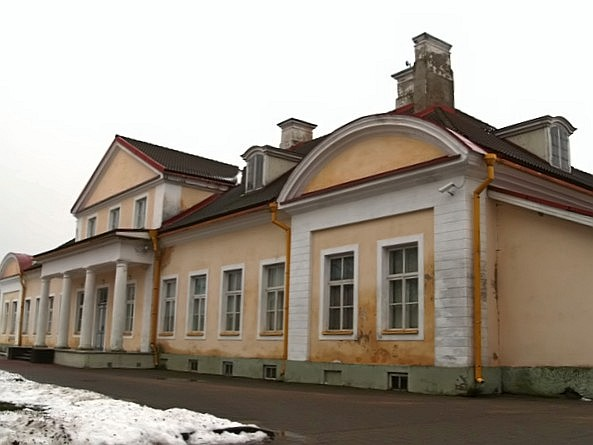
Koigi Manor

- Pöide church Manor (Pastorat Peude)
- Audla (Hauküll) - a Knight manor
- Kahtla (Kachtla, Kjachtla) - a State manor
- Keskvere (Keskfer) - a State manor
- Kingli (Müllershof) - a Knight manor
- Koigi (Koik) - a Knight manor
- Kõiguste (Koigust) - a State manor
- Kübassaare (Kübbasaar) - a support manor of Uuemõisa manor
- Laimjala (Laimjall) - a Knight manor
- Maasi (Masik) - a State manor
- Muraja (Murajo) - a support manor of Uuemõisa manor
- Orissaare (Orrisaar) - a Knight manor
- Oti (Peudehof) - a Knight manor
- Reina or Salli (Saltack) - a Knight manor
- Saare (Holmhof) - a Knighthood manor
- Tumala (Thomel) - a Knight manor
- Uuemõisa (Neuenhof) - a State manor

== See also ==
- Municipalities of Estonia
