= Kakuna, Estonia =

Village in Estonia

Coordinates: 58°27′48″N 023°16′11″E

Kakuna
- Village
- Interactive map of Kakuna
- Country: Estonia
- County: Saare County
- Parish: Saaremaa Parish
- Time zone: UTC+2 (EET)
  - Summer (DST): UTC+3 (EEST)

Kakuna is a village in Saaremaa Parish, Saare County, on the eastern part of Saaremaa Island, Estonia.

Before the administrative reform in 2017, the village was in Pöide Parish.
