= Saare County =

County of Estonia

Coordinates: 58°25′N 22°35′E

Saare County Saaremaa
- County
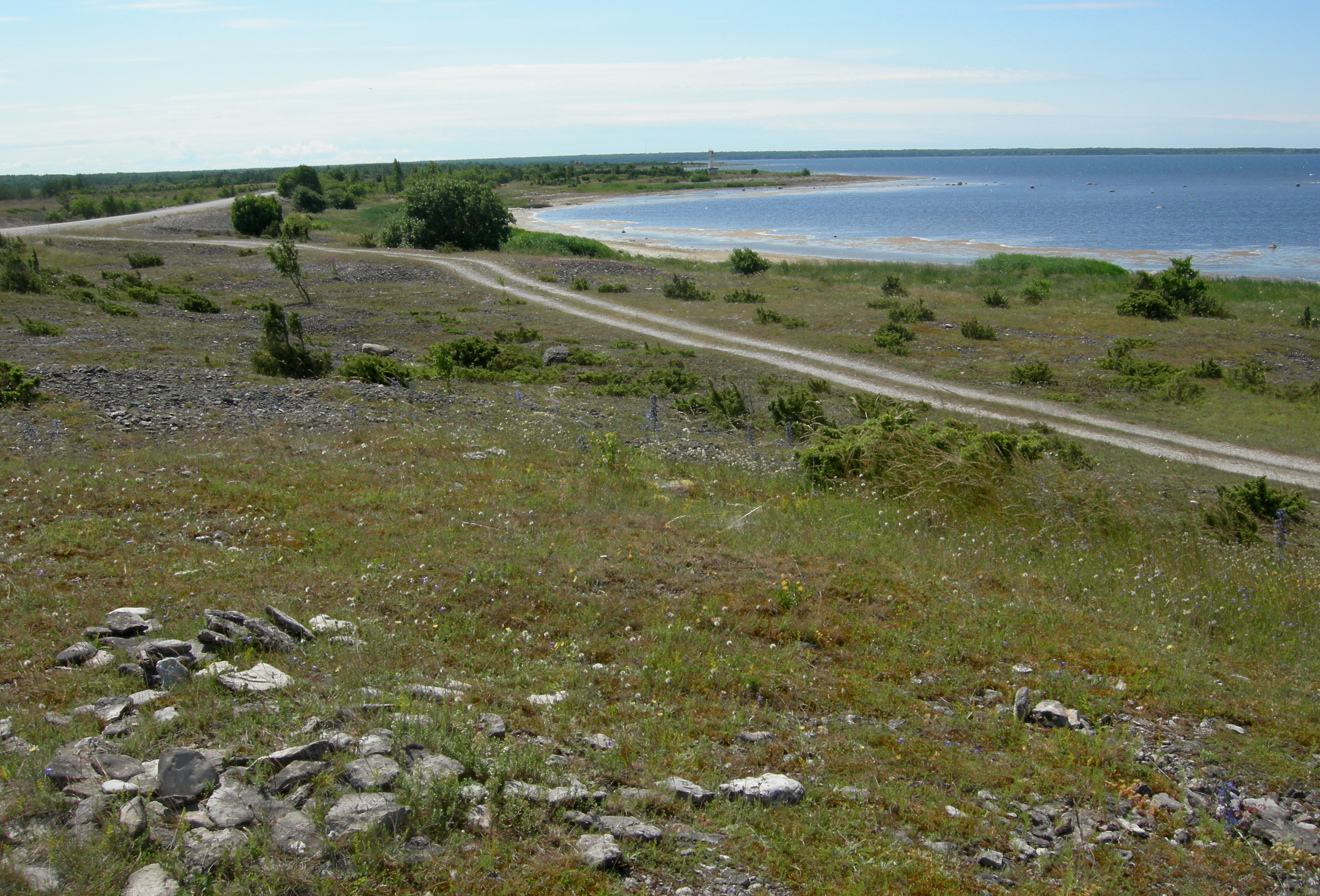

- Flag Coat of arms

- Country: Estonia
- Capital: Kuressaare

Area
  - Total: 2,922.19 km^{2} (1,128.26 sq mi)

Population (2022)
  - Total: 31,292
  - Rank: 9th
  - Density: 10.708/km^{2} (27.735/sq mi)

Ethnicity
  - Estonians: 98%
  - other: 2%

GDP
  - Total: €518 million (2022)
  - Per capita: €16,380 (2022)
- ISO 3166 code: EE-74
- Vehicle registration: K

Saare County (Estonian: Saare maakond or Saaremaa; Latin: Oesel; Danish: Øsel; German: Ösel; Swedish: Ösel) is one of 15 counties of Estonia. It consists of Saaremaa, the largest island of Estonia, and several smaller islands near it, most notably Muhu, Ruhnu, Abruka, and Vilsandi. The county borders Lääne County to the east, Hiiu County to the north, and Latvia to the south. In 2022, Saare County had a population of 31,292, which was 2.4% of the population of Estonia.

== Municipalities ==
The county is subdivided into municipalities. There are three rural municipalities (Estonian: vallad 'parishes') in Saare County.

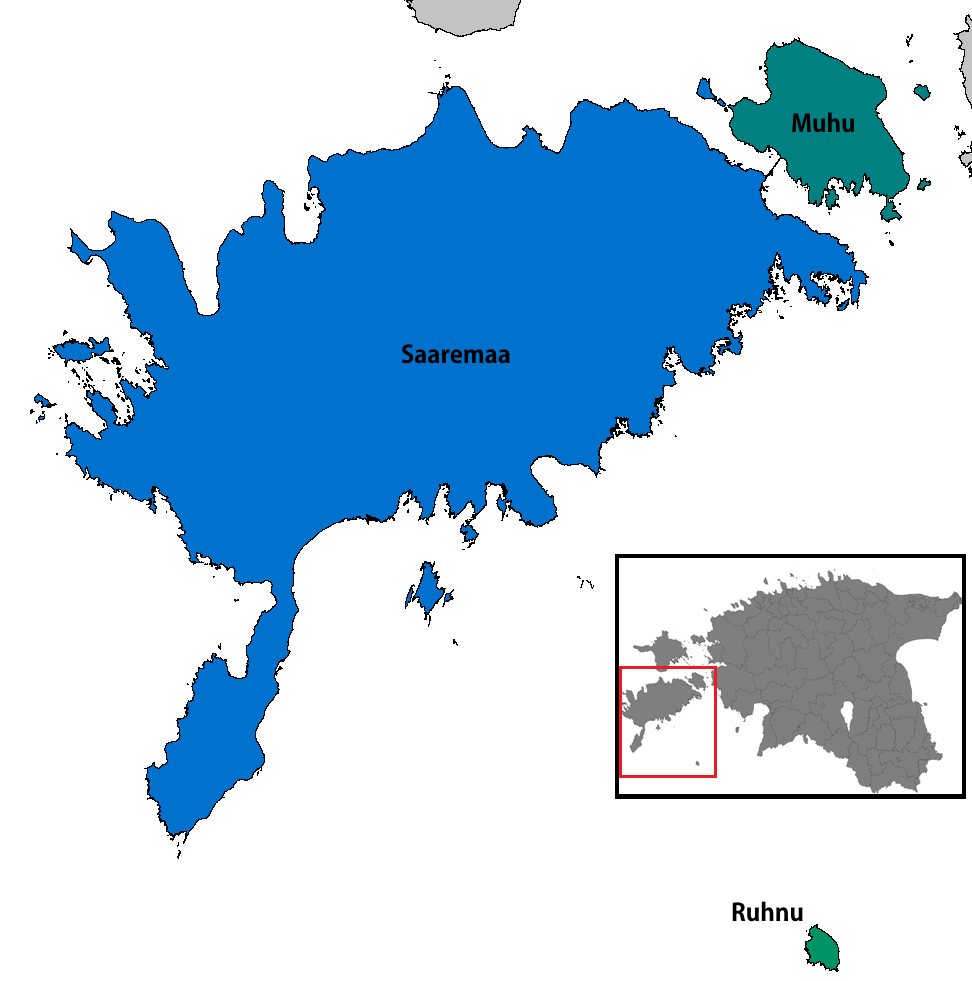
Municipalities in Saare County – Saaremaa, Muhu and Ruhnu

Rank	Municipality	Type	Population (2018)	Area km^{2}	Density
1	Muhu Parish	Rural	1,946	206	9.4
2	Ruhnu Parish	Rural	160	12	13.3
3	Saaremaa Parish	Rural	31,819	2,705	11.8

== Geography ==
The largest islands of the county are Saaremaa, Muhu, Ruhnu, Abruka, and Vilsandi. Arable land is 570 km^{2} (220 sq mi) and it has a mild maritime climate. The mean annual air temperature is 7.0–7.7 °C (44.6–45.9 °F) and the mean annual precipitation is 509 mm (20.0 in).

== Religion ==
The largest number of congregations in the county are of the Estonian Evangelical Lutheran Church (EELC) and there are 15 congregations in the county, which are administered by the EELC's Saarte Deanery.

Fourteen Orthodox congregations in the county are under the administration of the Estonian Apostolic Orthodox Church.

Five congregations of Baptists, and other Christian congregations operate in the county.

Among other religions, there is a congregation of the Estonian Neopagan religion in the county.

Religious affiliations in Saare County, census 2000–2021*
Religion	2000		2011		2021	
Religion	Number	%	Number	%	Number	%
Christianity	8,645	30.2	6,606	24.6	5,230	19.7
—Orthodox Christians	1,960	6.8	1,309	4.8	750	2.8
—Lutherans	5,889	20.6	4,612	17.2	3,710	14.0
—Catholics	14	0.04	27	0.1	60	0.2
—Baptists	400	1.4	274	1.0	290	1.1
—Jehovah's Witnesses	43	0.1	80	0.3	50	0.1
—Pentecostals	178	0.6	107	0.4	80	0.3
—Old Believers	0	0.0	3	0.01	-	-
—Methodists	128	0.4	76	0.2	120	0.4
—Adventists	33	0.1	34	0.1	20	0.07
—Other Christians	-	-	84	0.3	150	0.5
Islam	3	0.01	9	0.03	-	-
Buddhism	-		16	0.06	20	0.07
Other religions**	95	0.3	183	0.6	440	1.6
No religion	9,948	34.8	15,598	54.1	18,020	67.8
Not stated***	9,794	34.2	4,359	15,1	2,820	10.6
Total population*	28,585		26,826		26,550	
*The censuses of Estonia count the religious affiliations of the population older than 15 years of age. ".

== Ancient Saare county (Oesel) ==
According to archeological finds, the territory of Saaremaa has been inhabited for at least five thousand years.

In the first centuries AD, political and administrative subdivisions began to emerge in Estonia. Two larger subdivisions appeared: the parish (kihelkond) and the county (maakond). The parish consisted of several villages. Nearly all parishes had at least one fortress. The defense of the local area was directed by the highest official, the parish elder. The county was composed of several parishes, also headed by an elder. By the 13th century, the following major counties had developed in Estonia: Saaremaa (Oesel), Läänemaa (Rotalia or Maritima), Harjumaa (Harria), Rävala (Revalia), Virumaa (Vironia), Järvamaa (Jervia), Sakala (Saccala), and Ugandi (Ugaunia).

In old Scandinavian sagas, Saaremaa is called Eysysla which means exactly the same as the name of the island in Estonian: the district (land) of island. This is the origin of the island's name in German and Swedish, Ösel, Danish, Øsel, and in Latin Oesel. The name Eysysla appears sometimes together with Adalsysla, 'the big land', perhaps 'Suuremaa' or 'Suur Maa' in Estonian which refers to mainland Estonia. Sagas talk about numerous skirmishes between islanders and Vikings. Saaremaa was the wealthiest county of ancient Estonia and the home of notorious Estonian pirates, sometimes called the Eastern Vikings. The Chronicle of Henry of Livonia describes a fleet of sixteen ships and five hundred Oeselians ravaging the area that is now southern Sweden, then belonging to Denmark. In 1206, the Danish Valdemar II the Victorious built a fortress on the island but they found no volunteers to man it. They burned it down themselves and left. In 1227, Saaremaa was conquered by the Livonian Brothers of the Sword, but remained a hotbed of Estonian resistance. The Order founded the Bishopric of Ösel-Wiek there. When the Order was defeated by the Lithuanian army in the Battle of Saule in 1236, Oeselians rebelled. The conflict was ended by a treaty that was signed by the Oeselians and the Master of the Order.

Europe in the 9th century

The Oeselians along with the Curonians were known in the Old Norse Icelandic Sagas and in Heimskringla as Víkingr frá Esthland (in English, Estonian Vikings). Their sailing vessels were called pirate ships by Henry of Livonia in his Latin chronicles from the beginning of the 13th century.

Eistland or Esthland is the historical Germanic language name that refers to the country at the eastern shores of the Baltic Sea in general and is the origin of the modern national name for Estonia. The mainland of modern Estonia in the 8th century Ynglinga saga was called Adalsyssla in contrast to Eysyssel or Ösyssla that was the name of the island (Swedish): Ösel or (Estonian): Saaremaa, the home of the Oeselians (Estonian: Saarlased). In the 11th century, Courland and Estland (Estonia) were both denoted separately by Adam of Bremen.

On the eve of the Northern Crusades, the Oeselians were summarized in the Livonian Rhymed Chronicle thus: "The Oselians, neighbors to the Kurs (Curonians), are surrounded by the sea and never fear strong armies as their strength is in their ships. In summers when they can travel across the sea they oppress the surrounding lands by raiding both Christians and pagans."

=== Conquest of Saaremaa ===
In 1206, the Danish army led by king Valdemar II and Andreas, the Bishop of Lund landed on Saaremaa and attempted to establish a stronghold, but without success. In 1216 the Livonian Brothers of the Sword and the bishop Theodorich joined forces and invaded Saaremaa over the frozen sea. The following spring the Oeselians raided the territories in Latvia that were under German rule in revenge. In 1220, the Swedish army led by king John I of Sweden and the bishop Karl of Linköping conquered Lihula in Rotalia in Western Estonia. Oeselians attacked the Swedish stronghold the same year, conquered it and killed the entire Swedish garrison including the Bishop of Linköping.

In 1222, Valdemar II again tried to conquer Saaremaa, this time establishing a stone fortress housing a strong garrison. But the Danish stronghold was besieged, and surrendered within five days, and the Danish garrison returned to Reval, leaving bishop Albert of Riga's brother Theodoric and few others behind as hostages for peace. The castle was leveled to the ground by the Oeselians.

In 1227, the Livonian Brothers of the Sword, the town of Riga and the Bishop of Riga organized a combined attack against Saaremaa. After the surrender of two major Oeselian strongholds, Muhu and Valjala, the Oeselians formally accepted Christianity.

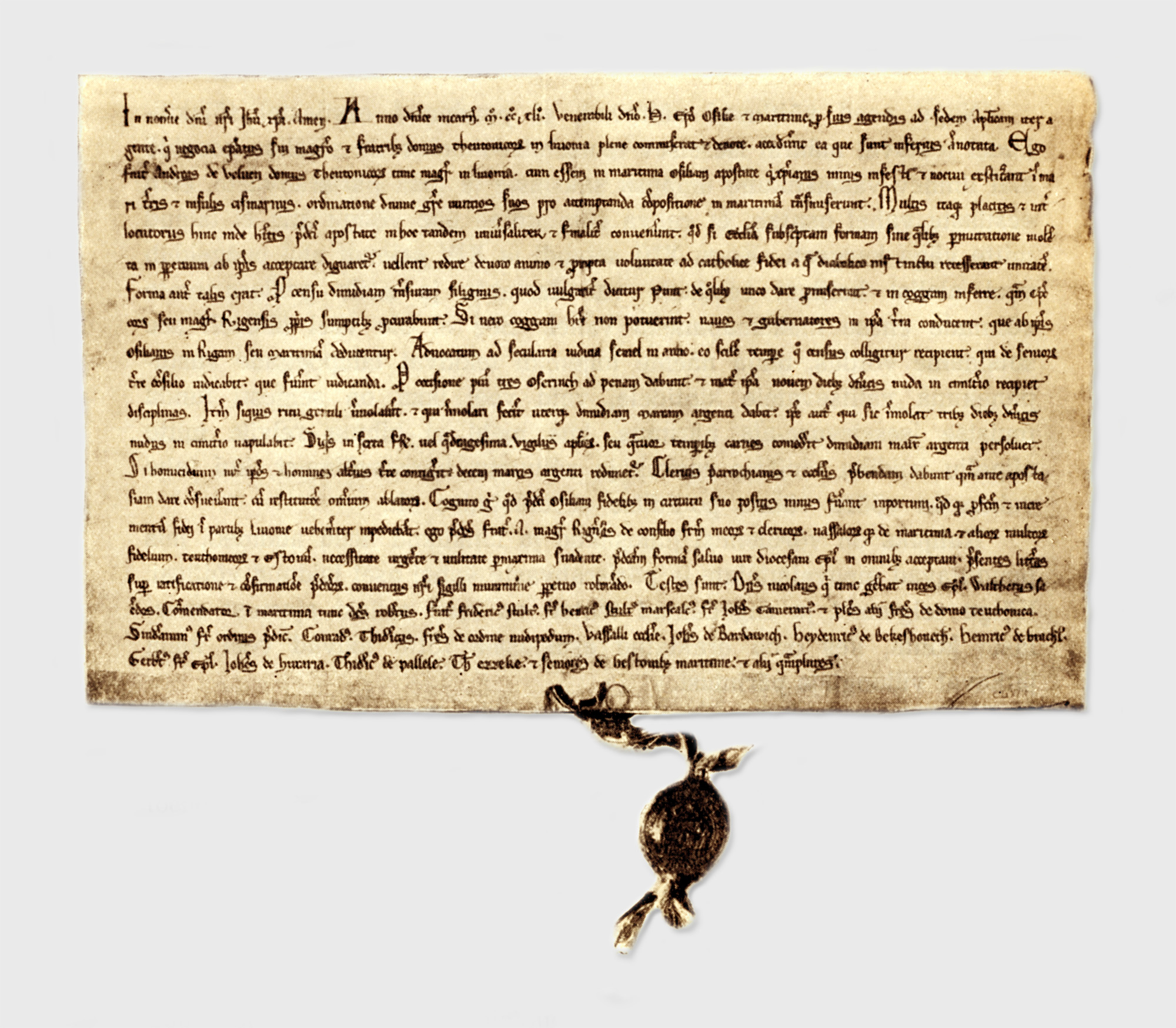
The 1241 Treaty between Livonian branch of the Teutonic Order, Bishopric of Ösel-Wiek and Oeselians at National Archives of Sweden

In 1236, after the defeat of the Livonian Brothers of the Sword in the Battle of Saule, military action on Saaremaa broke out again.

The Oeselians again accepted Christianity by signing treaties with the Master of Teutonic Order in Livonia Andreas de Velven and the Bishopric of Ösel-Wiek in 1241. The next treaty was signed in 1255 by the Master of the Order, Anno Sangerhausenn, and, on behalf of the Oeselians, by men whose "names" (or declaration) were transcribed by Latin scribes as Ylle, Culle, Enu, Muntelene, Tappete, Yalde, Melete, and Cake The treaty granted several distinctive rights to the Oeselians. The 1255 treaty included clauses concerning the ownership and inheritance of land, the social system and autonomy from certain religious rules.

In 1261, warfare continued as the Oeselians had once more renounced Christianity and killed all the Germans on the island. A peace treaty was signed after the united forces of the Livonian branch of the Teutonic Order, the Bishopric of Ösel-Wiek, and the forces of Danish Estonia, including mainland Estonians and Latvians, defeated the Oeselians by conquering the Kaarma stronghold. Soon afterwards, the Teutonic Knights established a stone fort at Pöide.

On July 24, 1343, the Oeselians again killed all the Germans on the island, drowned all the clerics and started to besiege the fort at Pöide. After its surrender, the Oeselians levelled the castle and killed all the defenders. In February 1344, Burchard von Dreileben led a campaign over the frozen sea to Saaremaa. The Oeselians' stronghold was conquered and their king Wesse was hanged. In the early spring of 1345, the next campaign of the Livonian branch of the Teutonic Order took place; it ended with a treaty mentioned in the Chronicle of Hermann von Wartberge and the Novgorod First Chronicle. Saaremaa remained the vassal of the master of the Teutonic Order in Livonia, and the Bishopric of Ösel-Wiek.

== Gallery ==
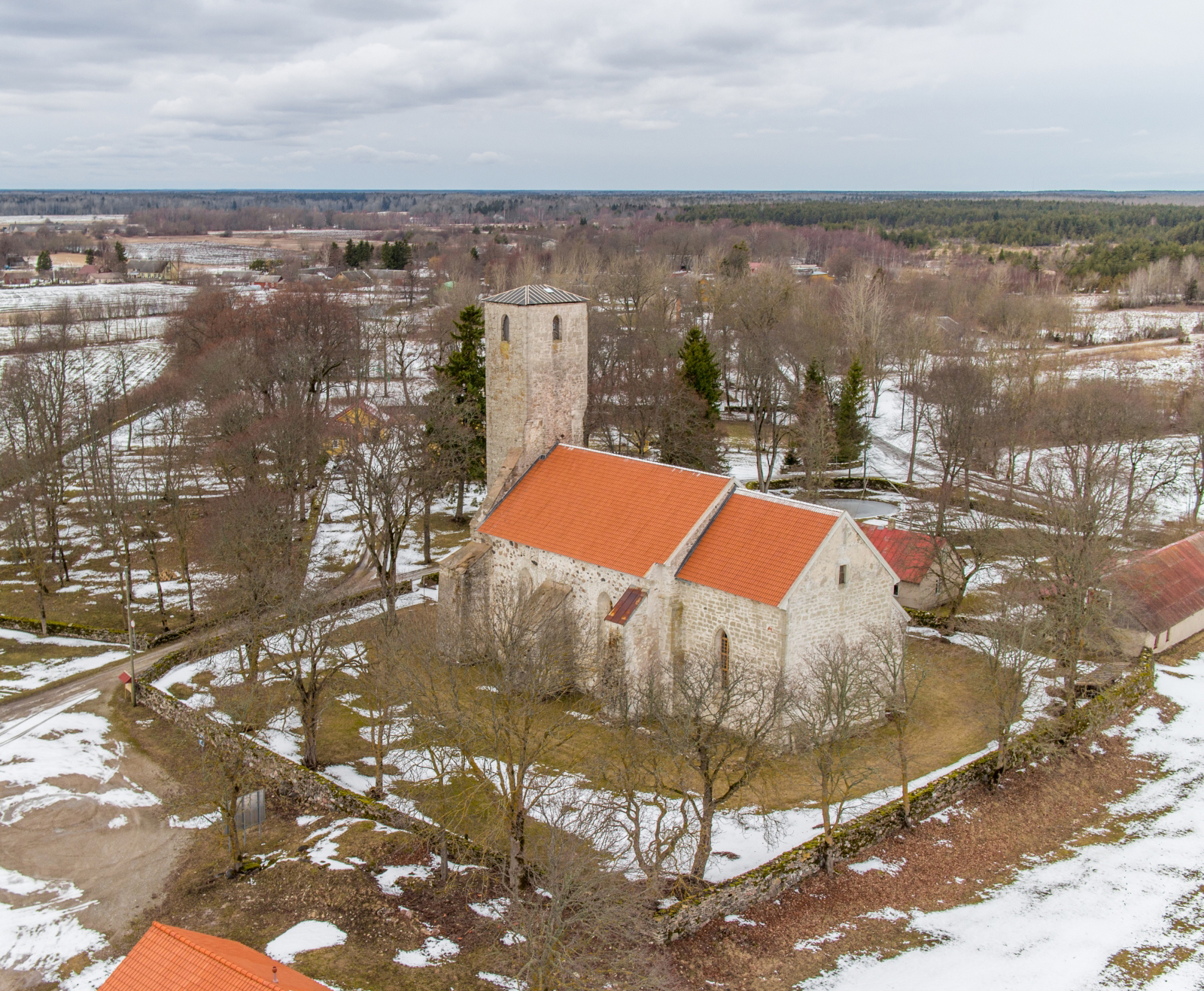
Püha church

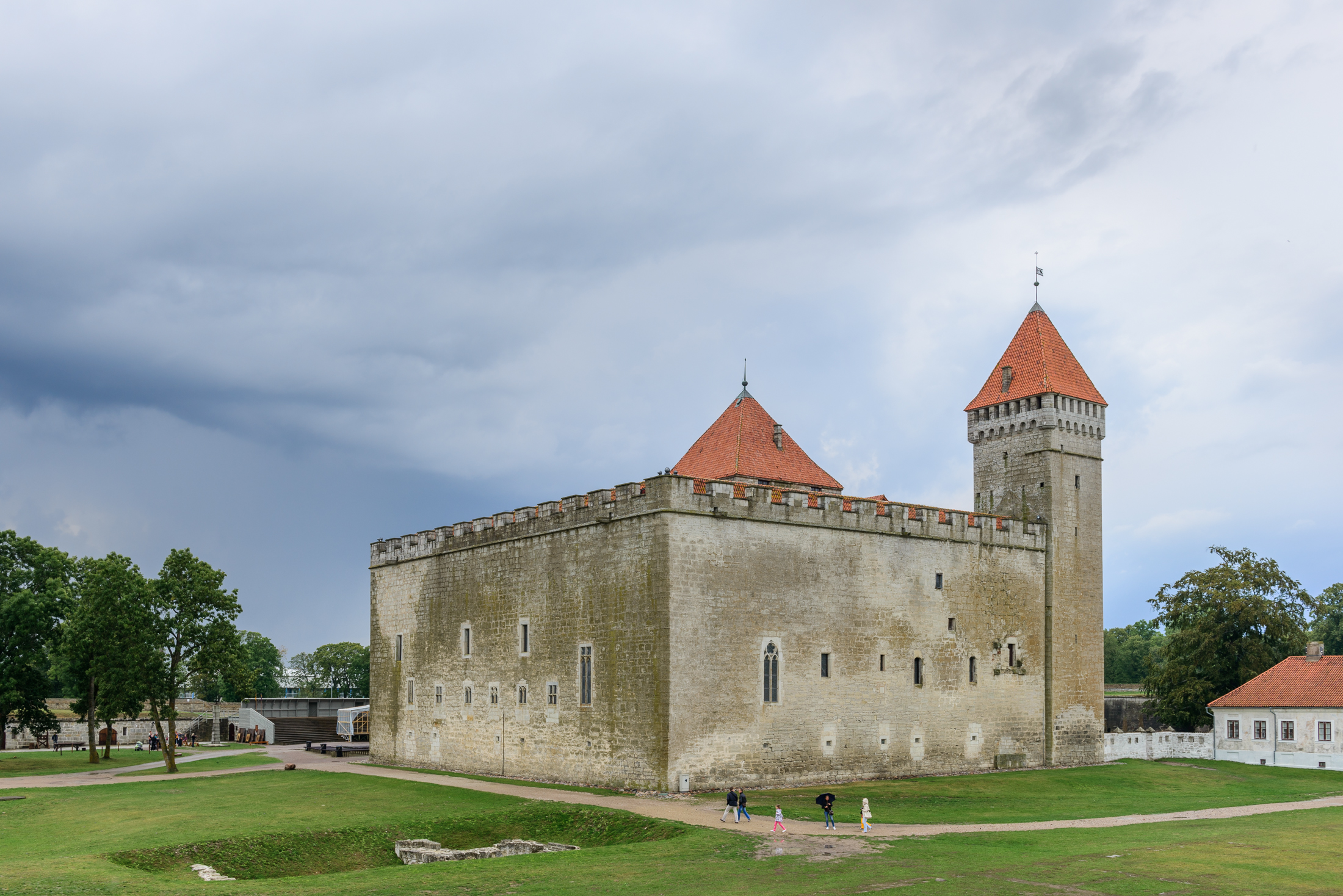
Kuressaare Castle

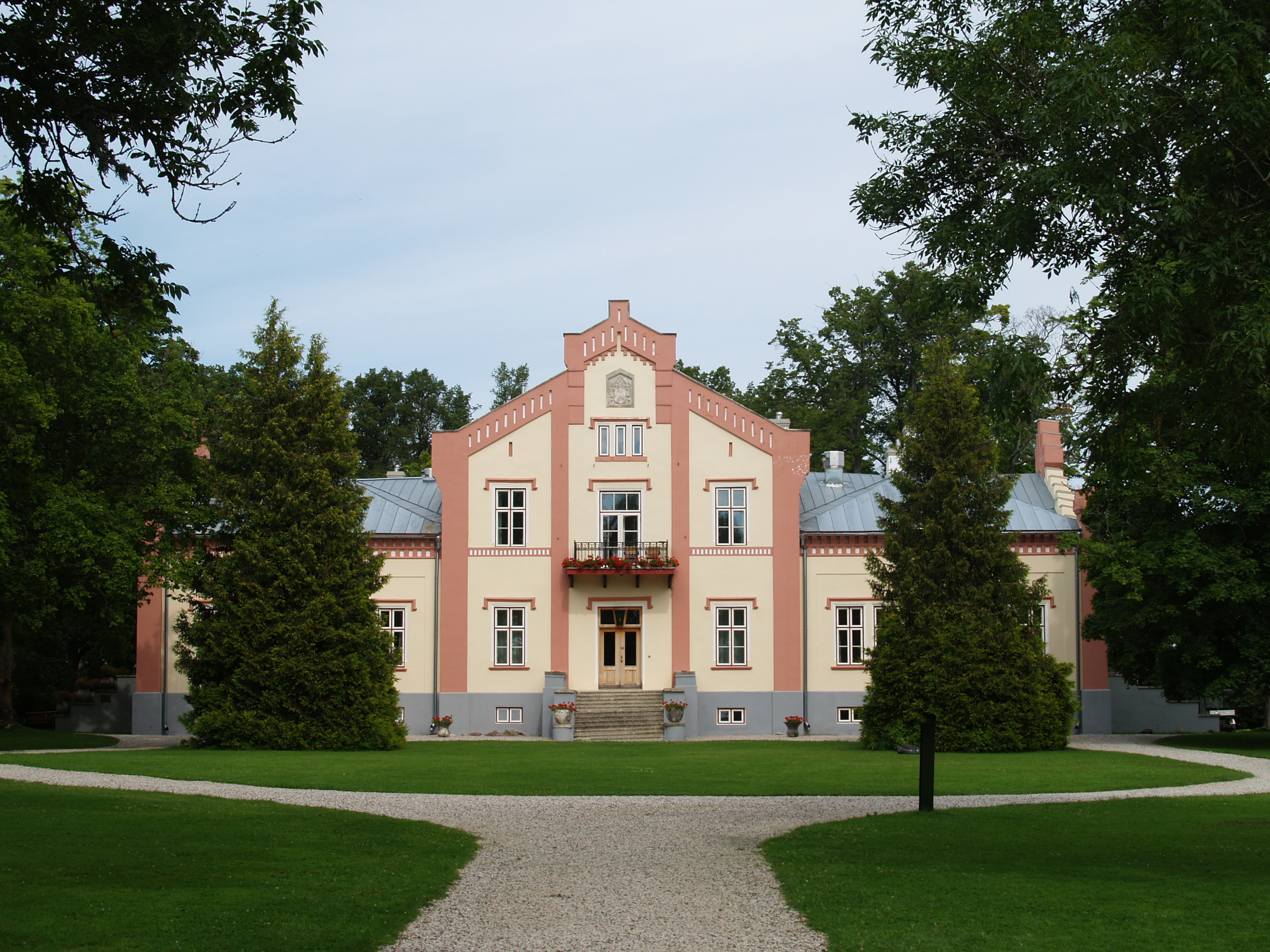
Pädaste manor

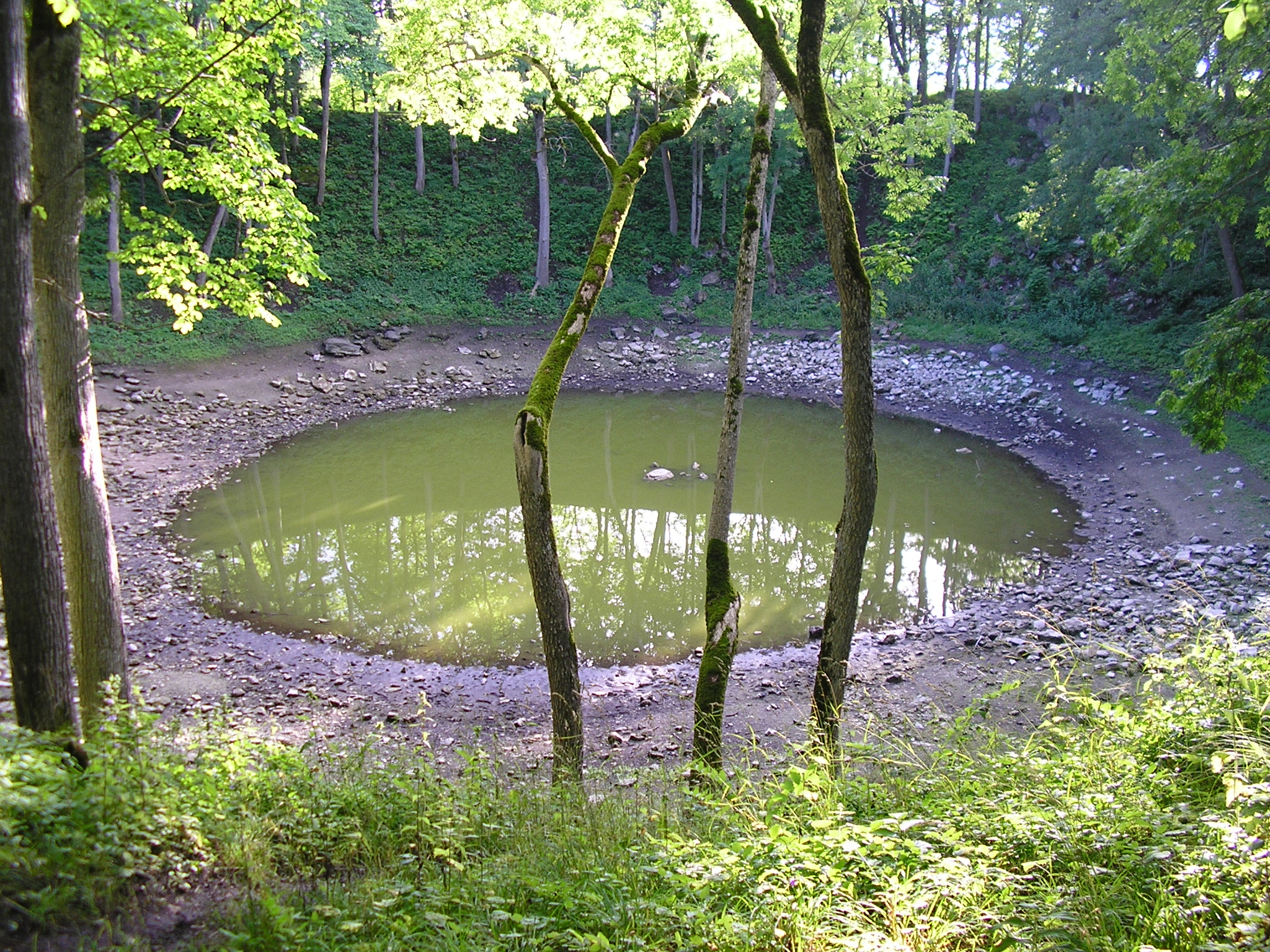
Kaali meteorite crater

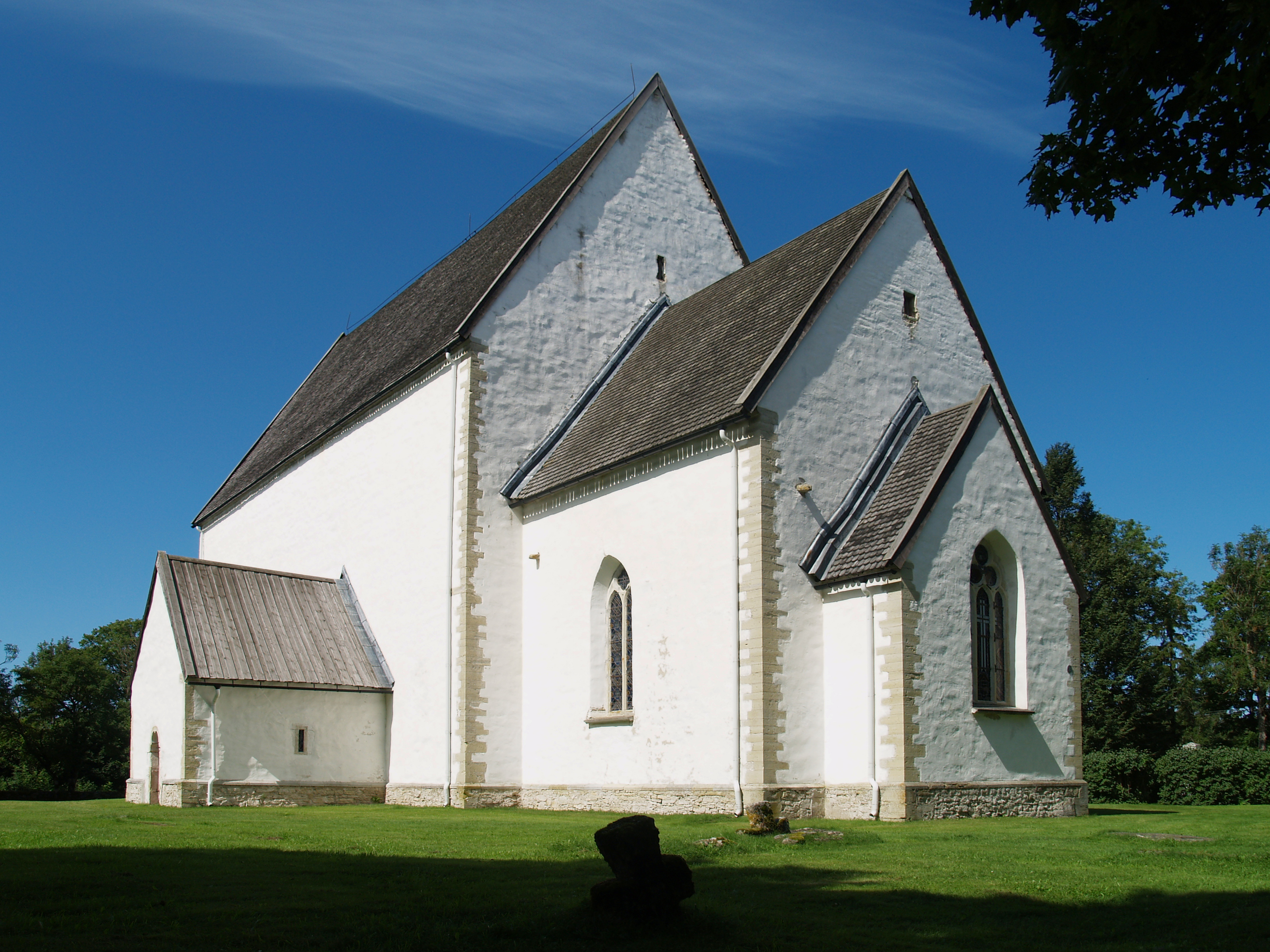
Muhu St. Catherine's Church

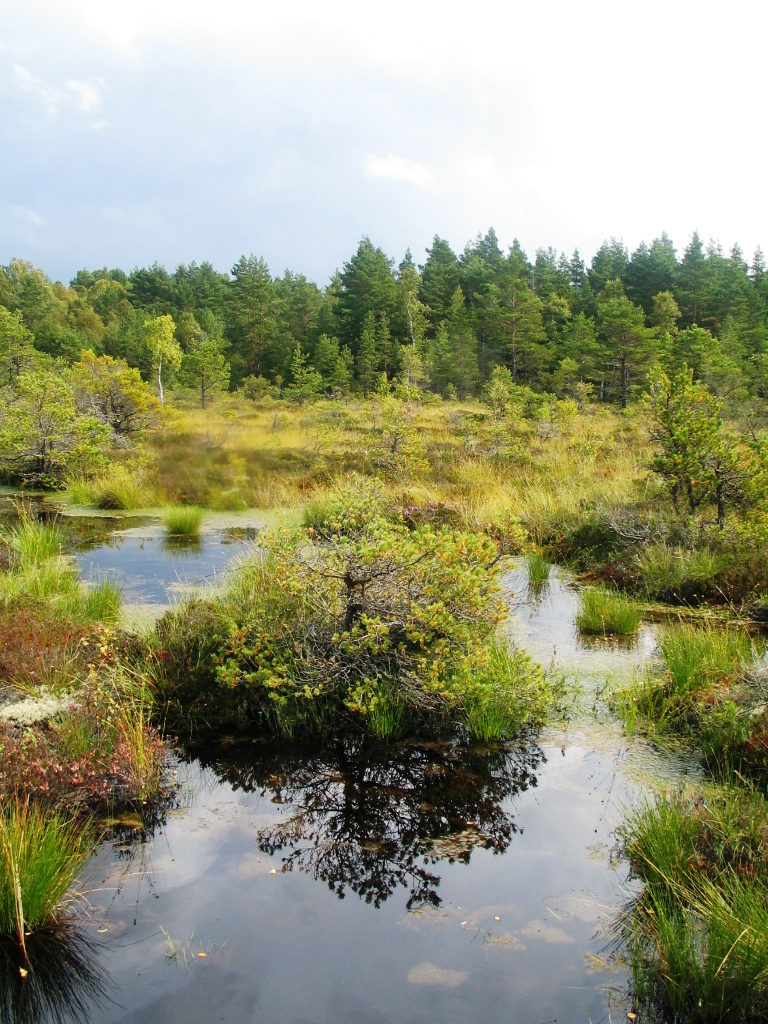
Koigi bog

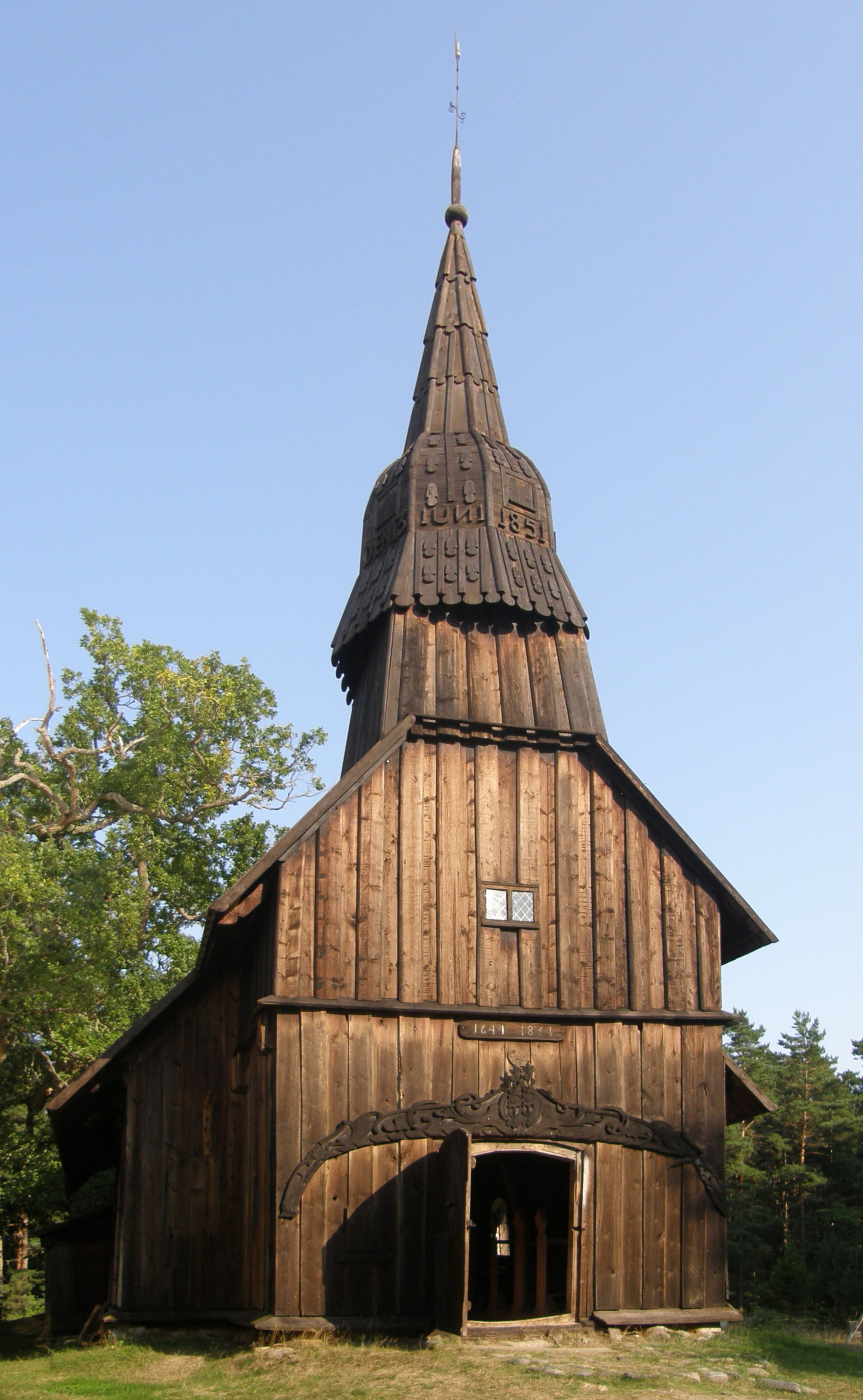
Ruhnu wooden church

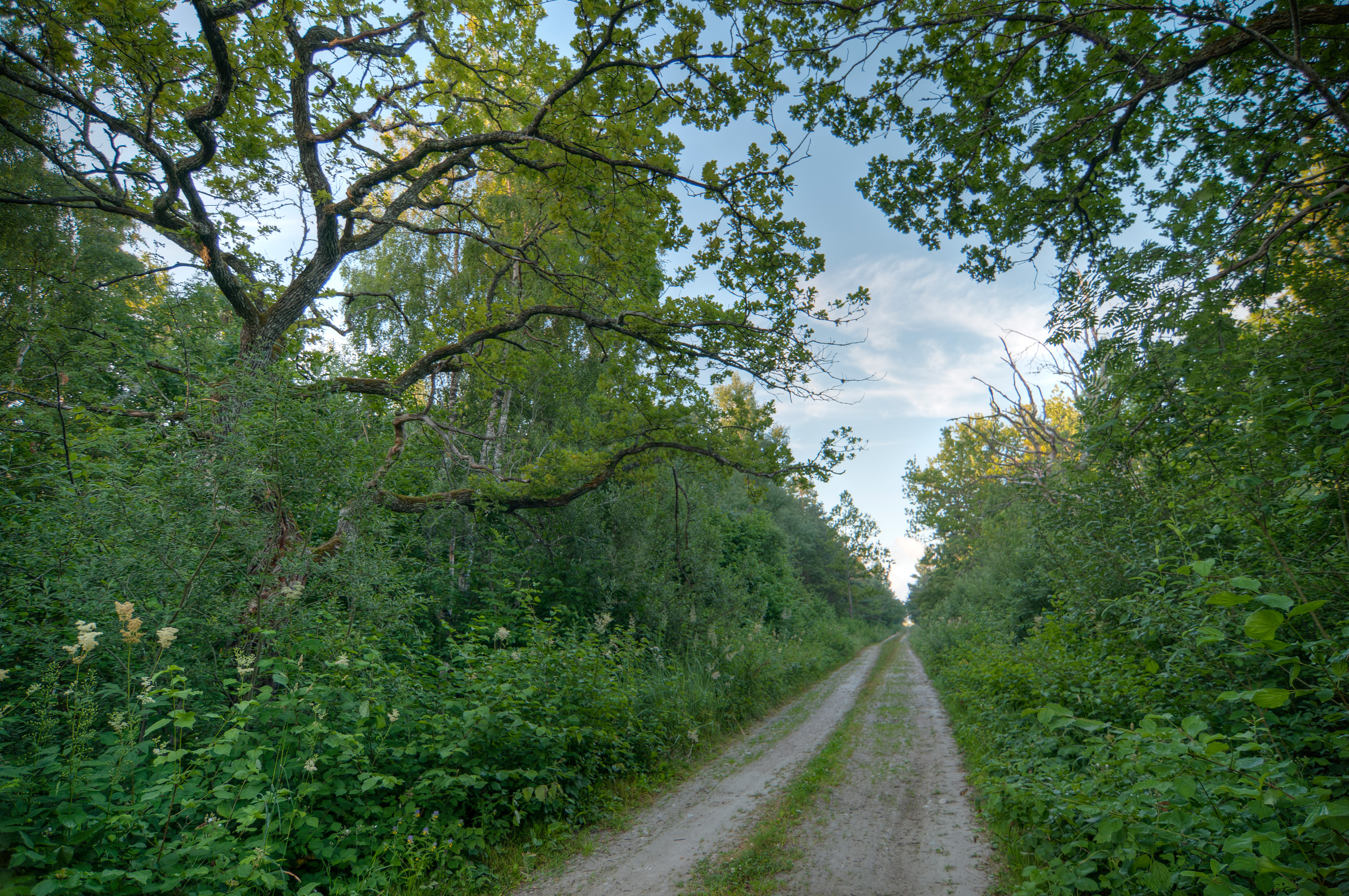
Forest road on Saaremaa

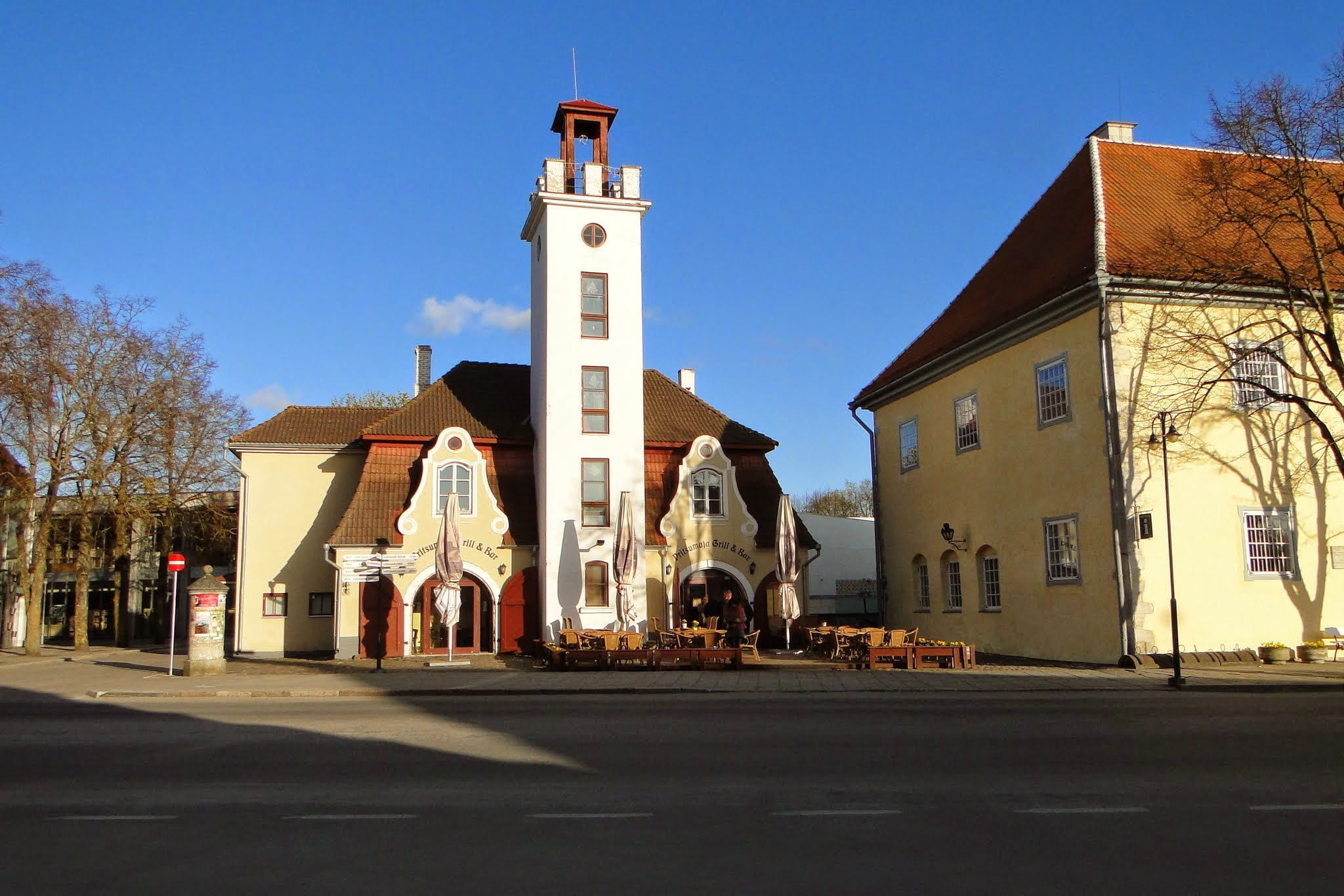
Historical buildings near the town center of Kuressaare

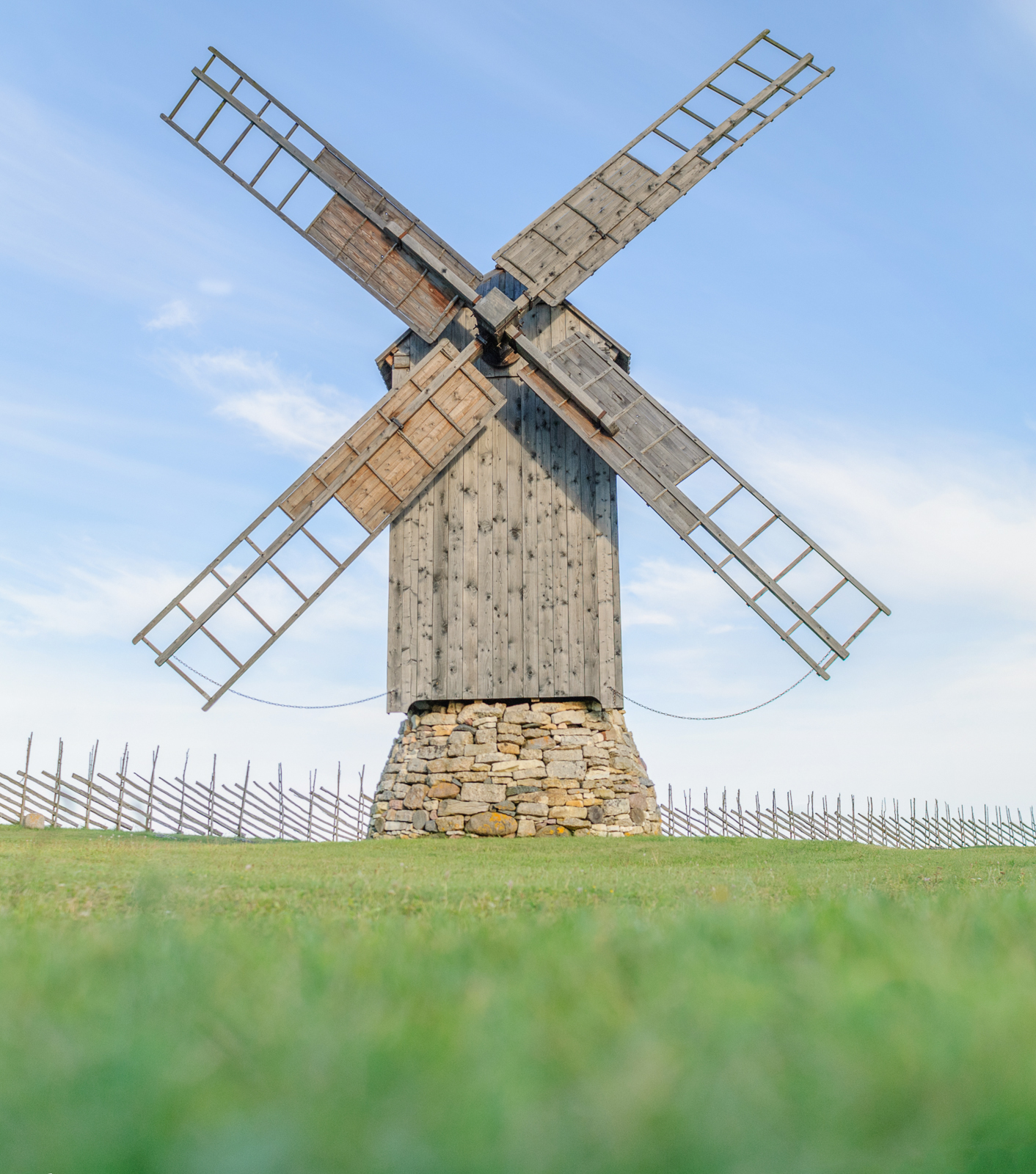
Angla windmill

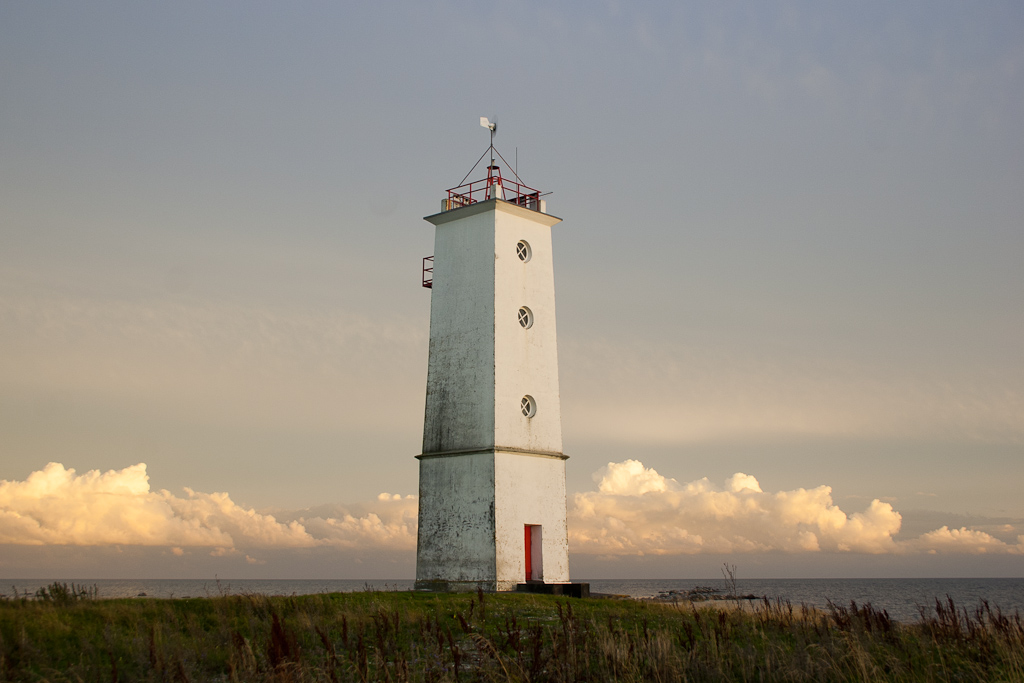
Saaretuka lighthouse

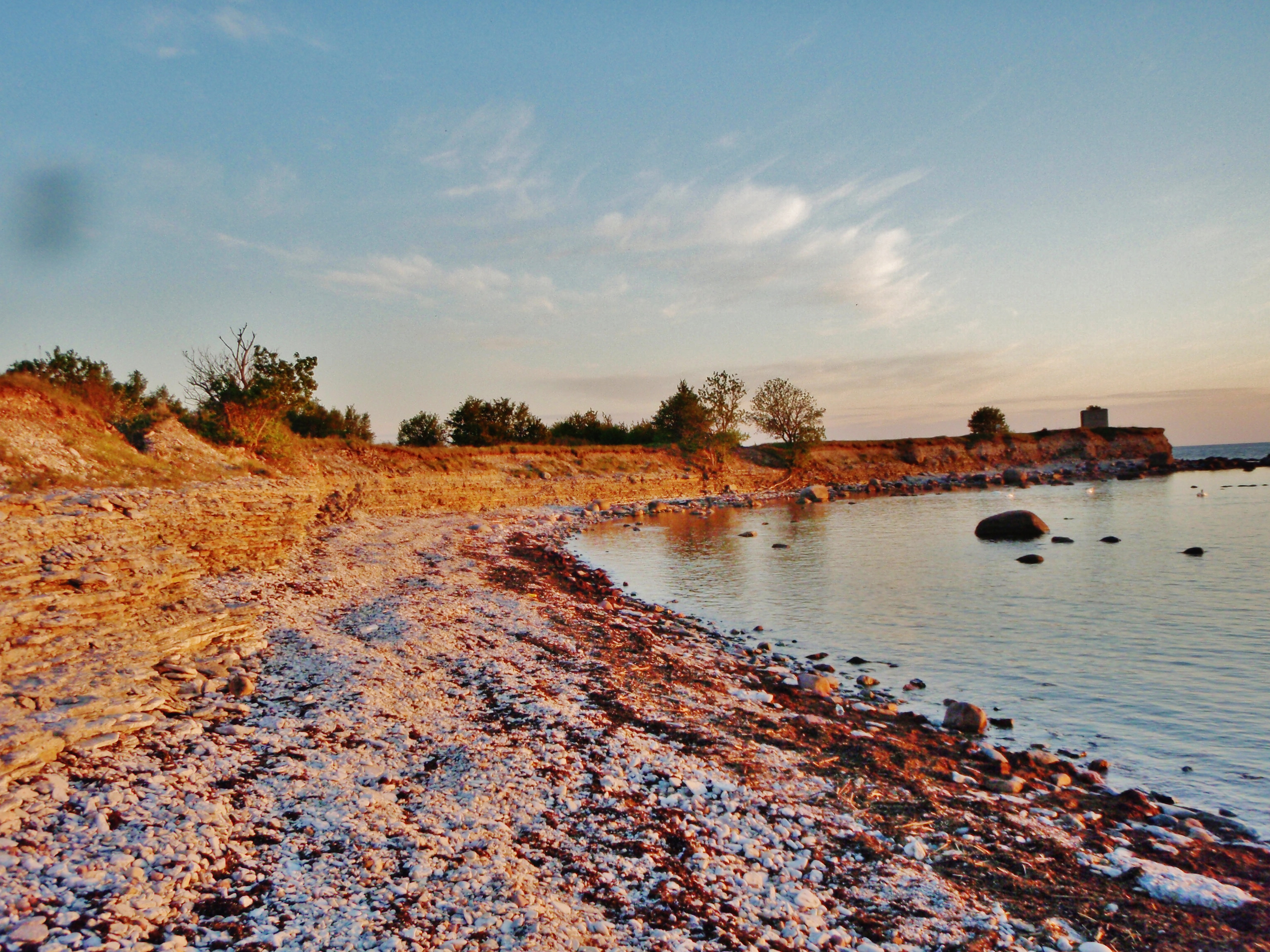
Ohessaare cliffs

== See also ==
- List of islands of Estonia
- Oeselians
- Salme ships
