= Mõndelaid =

Island in Estonia

Coordinates: 58°14′N 22°00′E

Mõndelaid (also Mõndalaid) is a 0.2694 ha (0.666 acres) islet on the western coast of Saaremaa island, Estonia. Administratively it belongs to Jõgela village, Lääne-Saare Parish, Saare County.

== See also ==
- List of islands of Estonia
