= Muhu Parish =

Municipality of Estonia

Muhu Parish Estonian: Muhu vald
- Municipality of Estonia
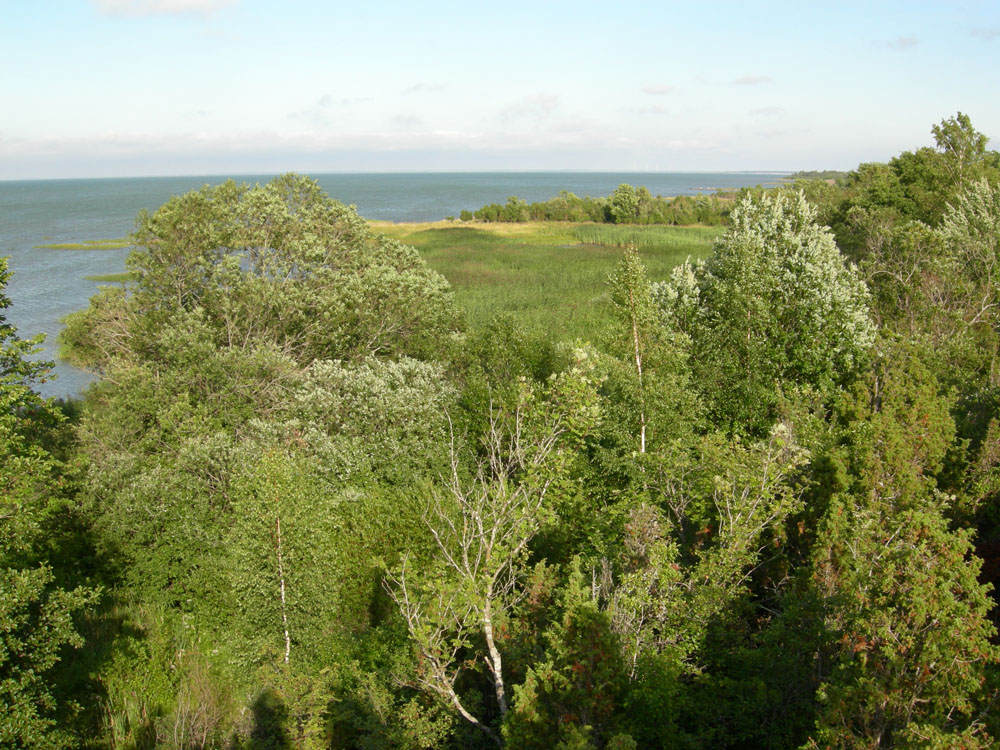
- Northern coast of Muhu

- Flag Coat of arms

- Muhu Parish within Saare County
- Country: Estonia
- County: Saare County
- Administrative Centre: Liiva

Area
  - Total: 208 km^{2} (80 sq mi)

Population (2026.01.01)
  - Total: 2,142
  - Density: 10.3/km^{2} (26.7/sq mi)
- ISO 3166 code: EE-478
- Website: www.muhu.ee

Muhu Parish (Estonian: Muhu vald) is a rural municipality of Estonia, in Saare County. It consists of 52 villages with a total population of 2,142 (as of 1 January 20126) and a total area of 208 km^{2} (80 sq mi).

== Geography ==
Muhu Parish is located on Muhu or Muhumaa and its neighbouring smaller islands of Kesselaid, Viirelaid, Võilaid and Suurlaid. It is located in the West Estonian archipelago and part of Saare County in the northeast of it. The main island, Muhu, is the third-largest island under the jurisdiction of Estonia. It touches the Baltic Sea. Muhu Parish is separated from mainland Estonia by the Suur Strait (Moonsund) and Saaremaa island by the Väike Strait.

Religion in Muhu Parish (2021)
1. Unaffiliated (79.3%)
2. Lutheran (9.60%)
3. Orthodox (6.90%)
4. Others Religions (0.70%)
5. Unknown (3.50%)

== Settlements ==
There are 52 villages (küla) in Muhu Parish. The villages are:

- Aljava
- Hellamaa
- Igaküla
- Kallaste
- Kantsi
- Kapi
- Kesselaid
- Koguva
- Kuviastu
- Külasema
- Laheküla
- Lalli
- Leeskopa
- Lehtmetsa
- Lepiku
- Levalõpme
- Liiva
- Linnuse
- Lõetsa
- Mäla
- Mõega
- Mõisaküla
- Nautse
- Nõmmküla
- Nurme
- Oina
- Pädaste
- Päelda
- Paenase
- Pallasmaa
- Pärase
- Piiri
- Põitse
- Raegma
- Rannaküla
- Rässa
- Raugi
- Rebaski
- Ridasi
- Rinsi
- Rootsivere
- Simiste
- Soonda
- Suuremõisa
- Tamse
- Tupenurme
- Tusti
- Vahtraste
- Vanamõisa
- Viira
- Võiküla
- Võlla.

== Gallery ==
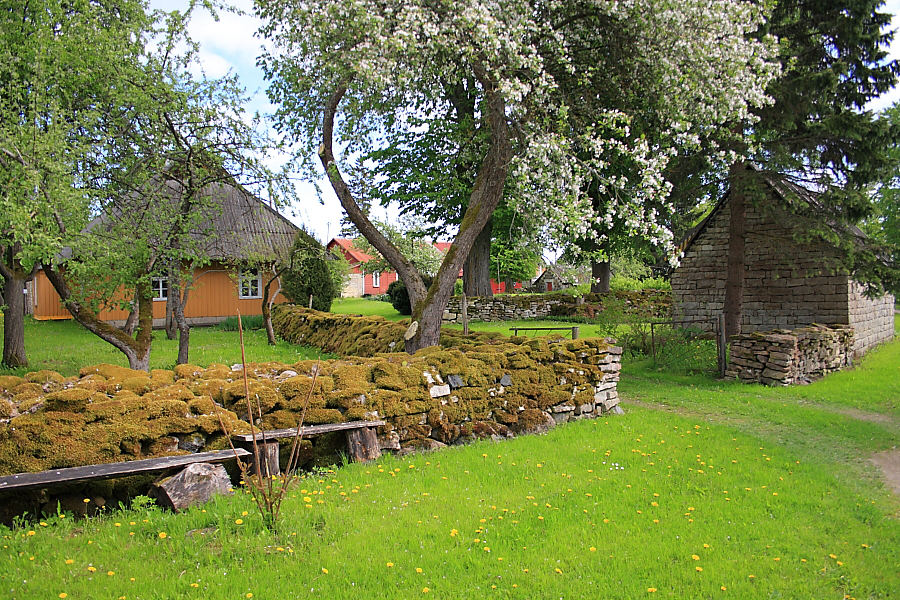
Mõega village

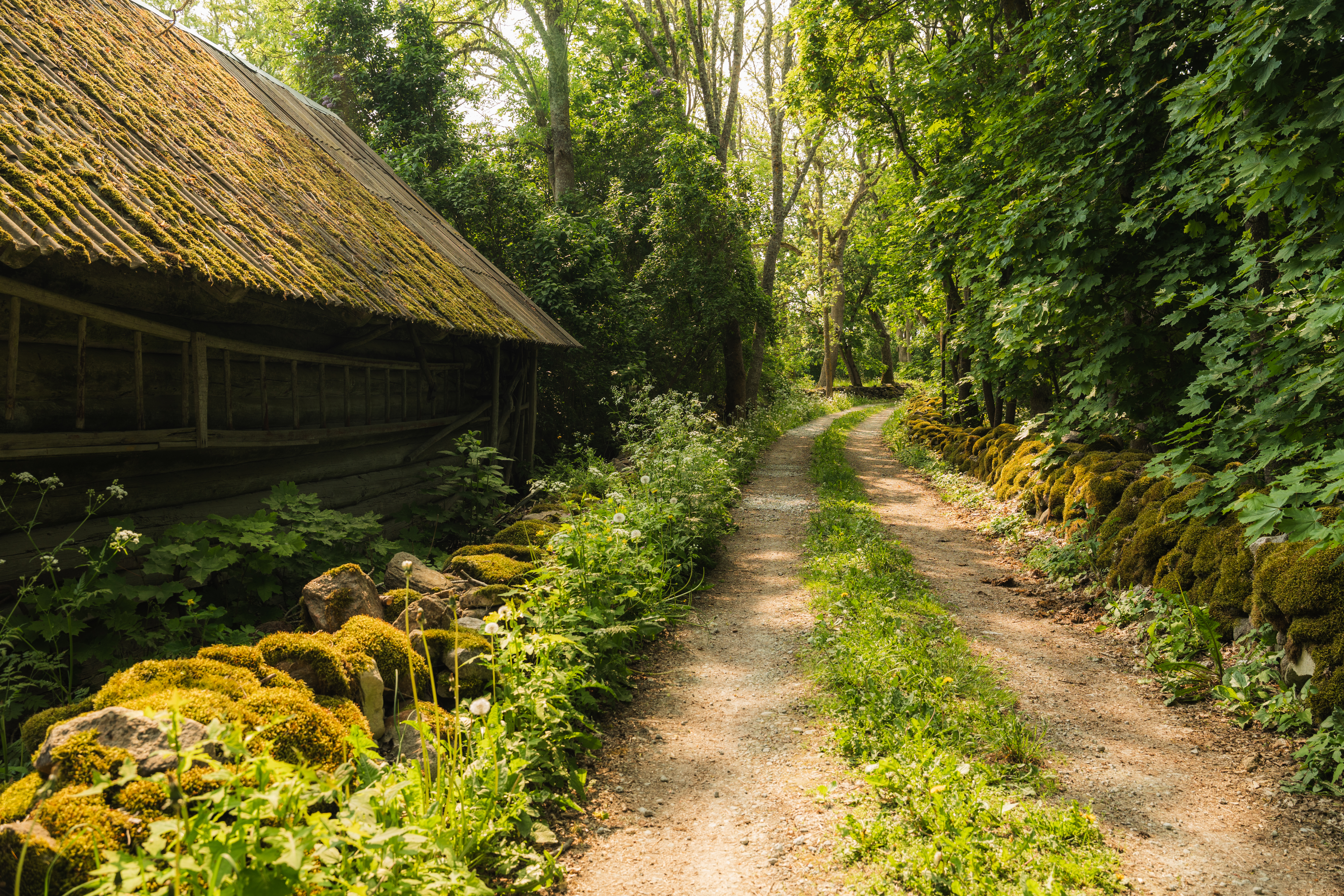
Dharma Resort, Rässa village

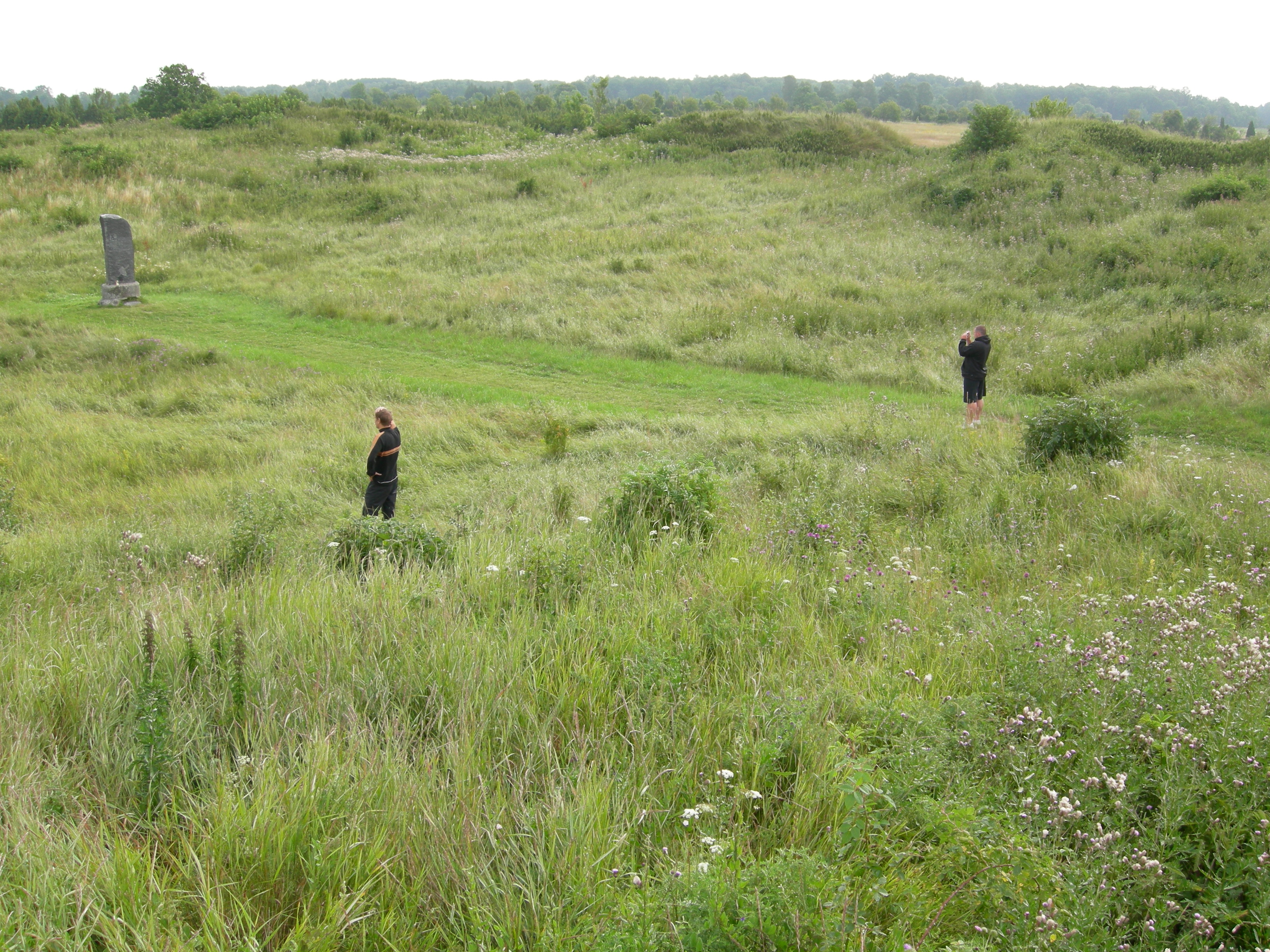
Muhu Stronghold

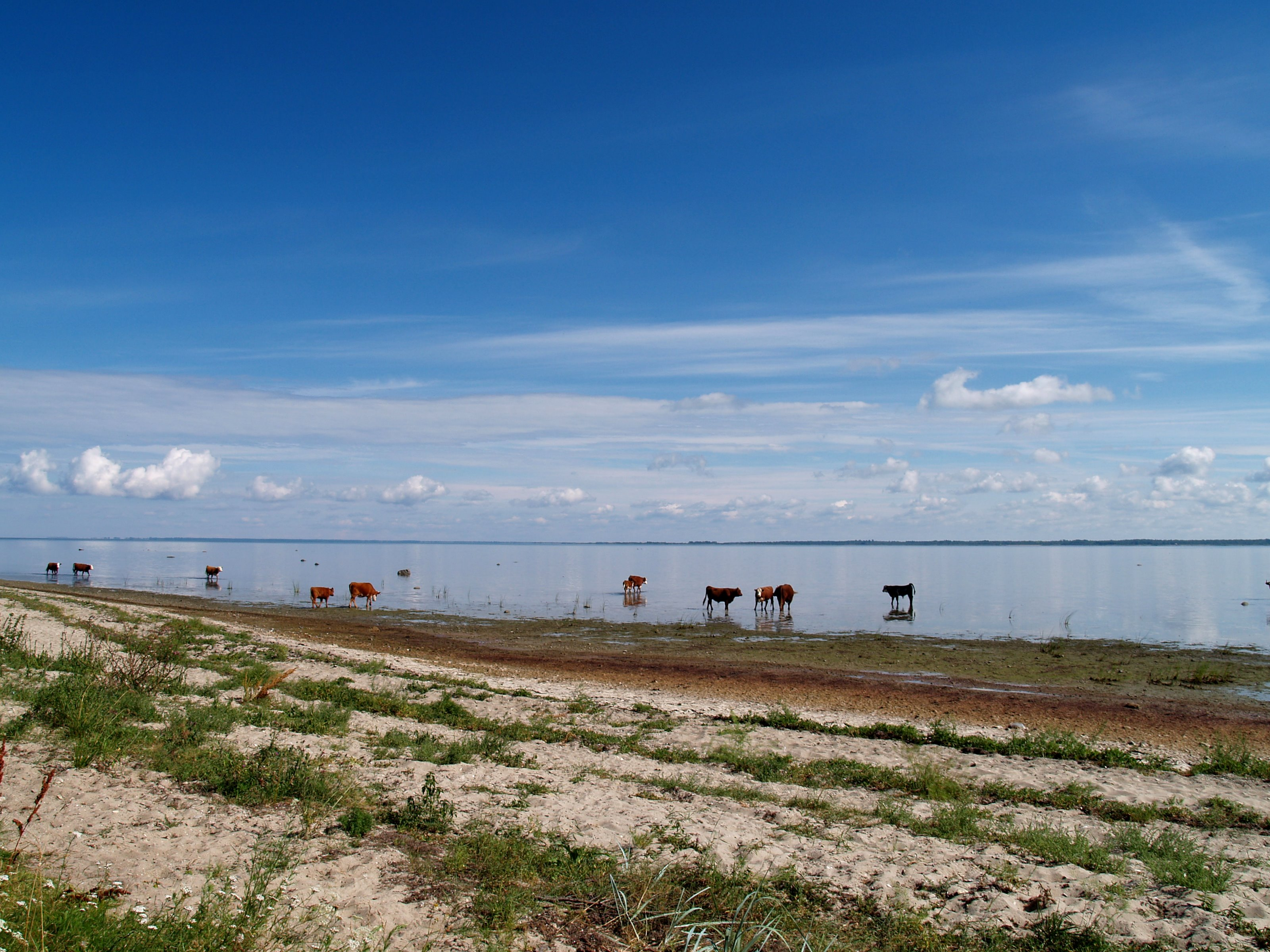
Cows in Kesselaid

Viirelaid

== Notable people ==
- Friedrich Wilhelm von Buxhoeveden (1750 in Muhu – 1811), a Baltic German general of the Infantry (Russian Empire)
- Alexander Schmidt (1831 in Muhu – 1894), a Baltic German physiologist
- Timotheus Kuusik (1863 in Lalli - 1940), school teacher, author, translator, editor and councilman
- Nikolai Kann (1873 in Rinsi – 1948), educator and politician; Minister of Education in 1920
- Peeter Kann (1883 in Hellamaa – 1943), military officer, jurist and judge Supreme Court of Estonia, 1920-1940
- Villem Grünthal-Ridala (1885 in Kuivastu – 1942), poet, translator, linguist and folklorist.
- Juhan Smuul (1922 in Koguva – 1971), writer, chair of the Estonian Writers' Union, secretary of the Union of Soviet Writers.
- Ülle Jaakma (born 1957 in Muhu), agronomist. rector of Estonian University of Life Sciences since 2023
- Villu Veski (born 1962 in Hellamaa), saxophonist, teacher at Estonian Academy of Music and Theatre, 2001/2003
