= Nurme =

Nurme may refer to:

== Places in Estonia ==
- Nurme, Harju County, village in Saue Parish, Harju County
  - Nurme Lake, lake in Nurme village, Saue Parish, Harju County
- Nurme, Järva County, village in Paide, Järva County
- Nurme, Lääne-Viru County, village in Rakvere Parish, Lääne-Viru County
- Nurme, Lääneranna Parish, village in Lääneranna Parish, Pärnu County
- Nurme, Muhu Parish, village in Muhu Parish, Saare County
- Nurme, Rapla County, village in Märjamaa Parish, Rapla County
- Nurme, Saaremaa Parish, village in Saaremaa Parish, Saare County
- Nurme, Tori Parish, village in Tori Parish, Pärnu County
- Valjala-Nurme (formerly Nurme), village in Saaremaa Parish, Saare County

== People ==
- Minni Nurme (1917–1994), Estonian writer
- Simon Nurme (born 1982), Swedish football player
- Tiidrek Nurme (born 1985), Estonian middle-distance runner

== See also ==
- Nurmes
