= Suuremõisa =

Suuremõisa may refer to several places in Estonia:

- Suuremõisa, Hiiu County, village in Hiiumaa Parish, Hiiu County
- Suuremõisa, Lääne County, village in Vormsi Parish, Lääne County
- Suuremõisa, Saare County, village in Muhu Parish, Saare County
