= Piiri =

Piiri may refer to several places in Estonia:

- Piiri, Saare County, village in Muhu Parish, Saare County
- Piiri, Tartu County, village in Piirissaare Parish, Tartu County
- Piiri, Valga County, village in Hummuli Parish, Valga County
