= Tusti =

Tusti may refer to several places in Estonia:

- Tusti, Saare County, village in Estonia
- Tusti, Viljandi County, village in Estonia
