= Linnuse =

Linnuse may refer to several places in Estonia:

- Linnuse, Pärnu County, village in Lääneranna Parish, Lääne County
- Linnuse, Lääne-Viru County, village in Viru-Nigula Parish, Lääne-Viru County
- Linnuse, Saaremaa Parish, village in Saaremaa Parish, Saare County
- Linnuse, Muhu Parish, village in Muhu Parish, Saare County
