= Vahtrepa Landscape Conservation Area =

Protected area in Estonia

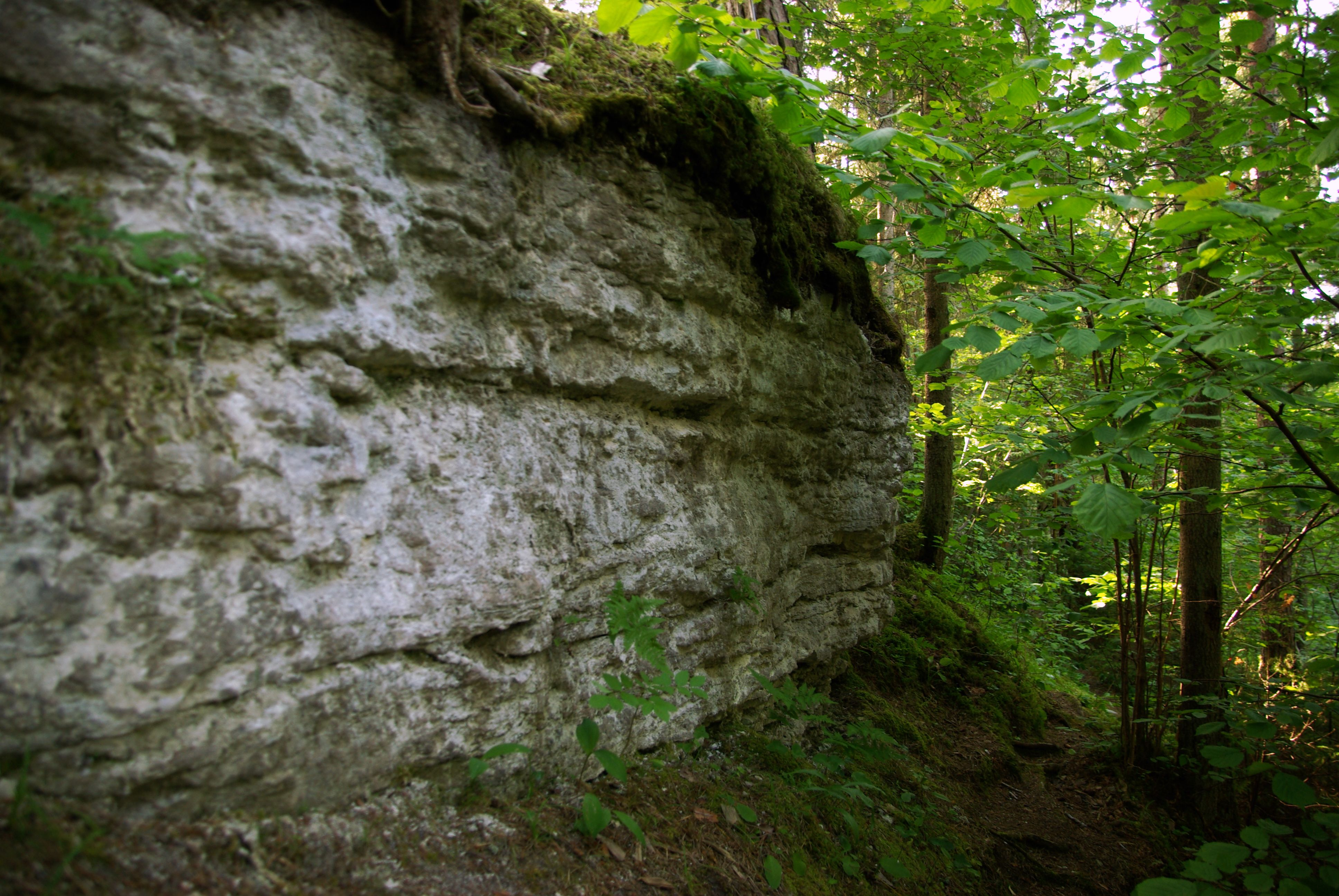

- Location within Estonia
- Location: Estonia
- Coordinates: 58°55′N 23°00′E
- Area: 1,395 ha (3,450 acres)
- Established: 1962 (1998)

Vahtrepa Landscape Conservation Area is a nature park which is located in Hiiu County, Estonia.

The area of the nature park is 1395 ha.

The protected area was founded in 1962 to protect Kallaste Cliff. In 1998, the protected area was designated to the landscape conservation area.
