= Viira =

Viira may refer to several places in Estonia:

- Viira, Põlva County, village in Veriora Parish, Põlva County
- Viira, Lääne-Saare Parish, village in Lääne-Saare Parish, Saare County
- Viira, Leisi Parish, village in Leisi Parish, Saare County
- Viira, Muhu Parish, village in Muhu Parish, Saare County
- Viira, Tartu County, village in Luunja Parish, Tartu County
