= Lepiku =

Lepiku may refer to several places in Estonia:

- Lepiku, Hiiu County, village in Hiiumaa Parish, Hiiu County
- Lepiku, Lääne-Viru County, village in Vinni Parish, Lääne County
- Lepiku, Saare County, village in Muhu Parish, Saare County
- Lepiku, Tartu County, village in Kambja Parish, Tartu County
- Lepiku, Tallinn, subdistrict of Tallinn
