= Mõega =

Village in Estonia

- Village
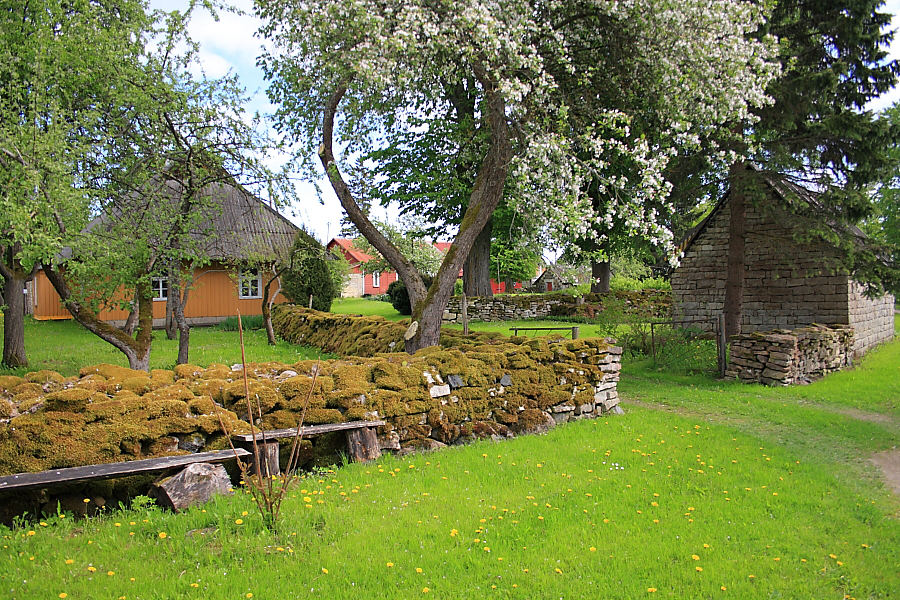

- Location in Estonia
- Coordinates: 58°35′22″N 23°19′04″E
- Country: Estonia
- County: Saare County
- Municipality: Muhu Parish

Mõega is a village on the Estonian Baltic Sea island of Muhu. It is located in the eastern part of the island along the main road on Muhu (a segment of the Risti–Kuressaare road, no. 10, or the "Saaremaa road"), just between Kuivastu (the main port in Muhu) and Liiva (the administrative centre of the municipality). Administratively, Mõega belongs to Muhu Parish in Saare County.

Mõega is home to the Tammisaare Farm Museum.

Mõega Leedumägi was an important burial site in ancient Muhu. It was destroyed during road construction in Soviet times.
