= Liiva, Muhu Parish =

Village in Estonia

Liiva
- Village
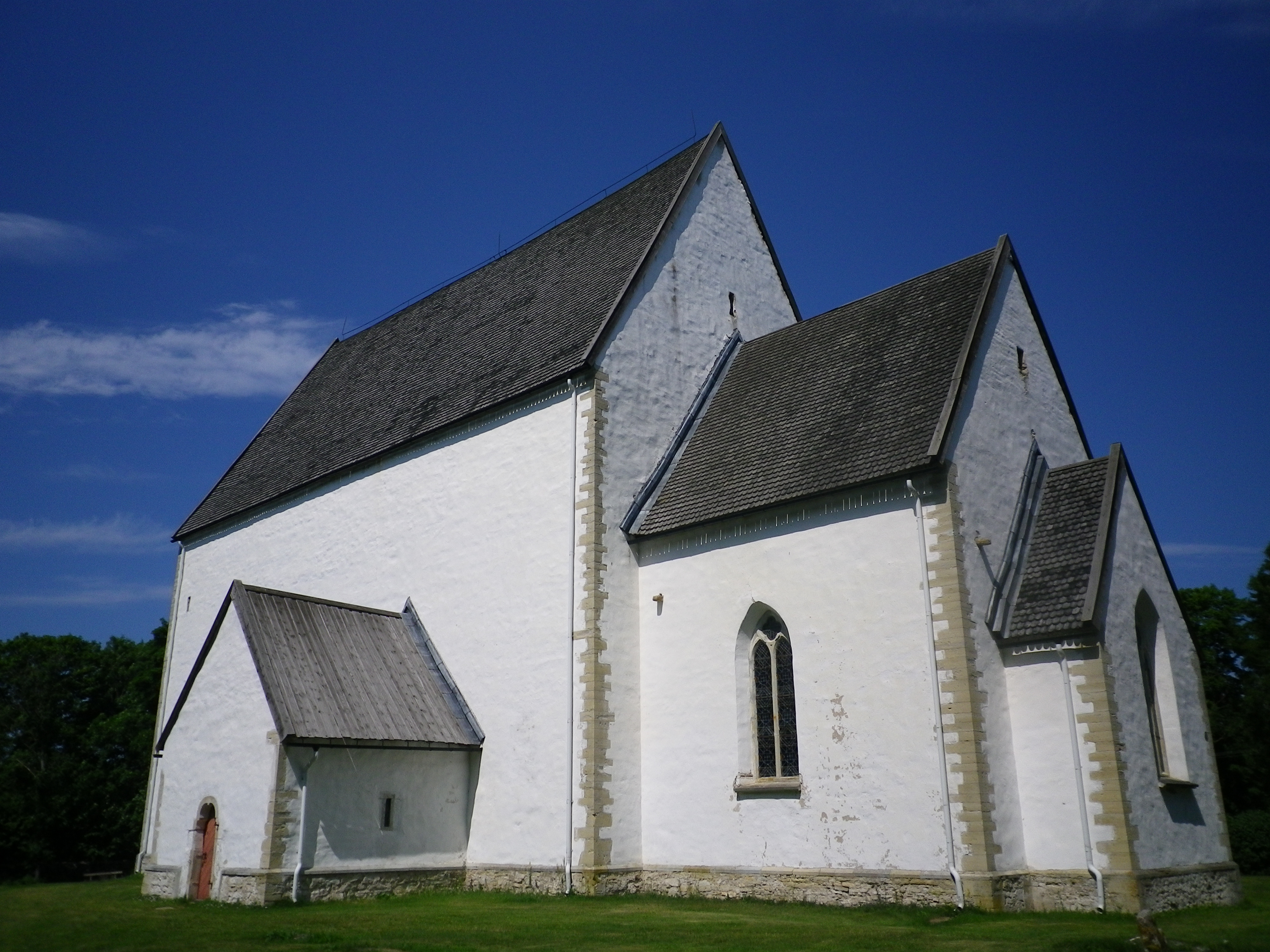
- St. Catherine's Church in Liiva

- Location in Estonia
- Coordinates: 58°36′20″N 23°14′14″E
- Country: Estonia
- County: Saare County
- Municipality: Muhu Parish
- First mentioned: 1267

Area
  - Total: 1.5 km^{2} (0.58 sq mi)

Population (01.01.2012)
  - Total: 189
  - Density: 130/km^{2} (330/sq mi)

Liiva is a village on the Estonian island of Muhu. It is the administrative centre of Muhu Parish in Saare County, and it is also the largest village in the municipality, with a population of 189 (as of 1 January 2012). Liiva is located in the heart of the island along the main road (part of road no. 10 from Risti to Kuressaare).

Liiva is the location of the Early Gothic St. Catherine's Church (also known as Muhu Church), which dates from the 13th century.

Not far from the church there is a rectory from 1832, where the physiologist and founder of the coagulation theory Alexander Schmidt was born.

Liiva is home to Muhu Primary School, with about 100 pupils. The village also has a library, a supermarket (Konsum), a post office, and a pharmacy.

== Gallery ==
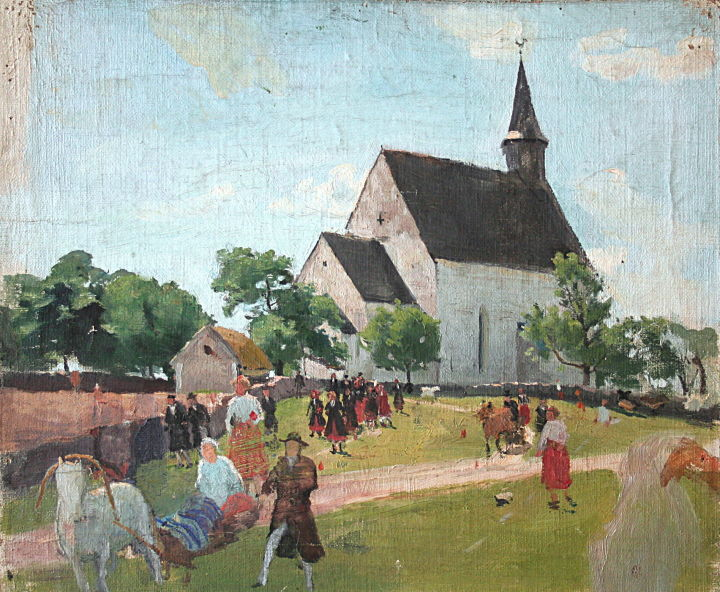
Muhu Church by Paul Raud (1898)

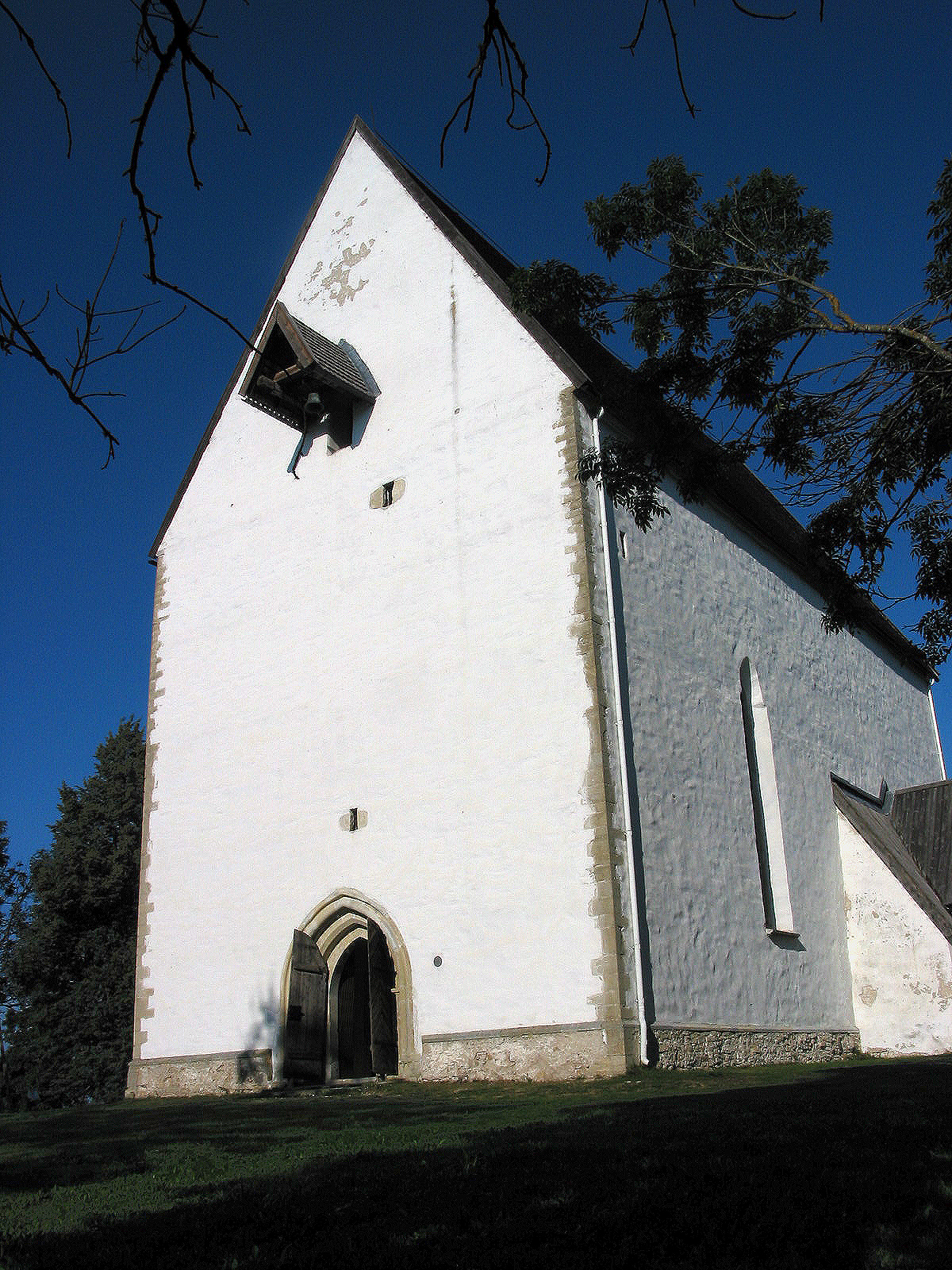
Front view of church

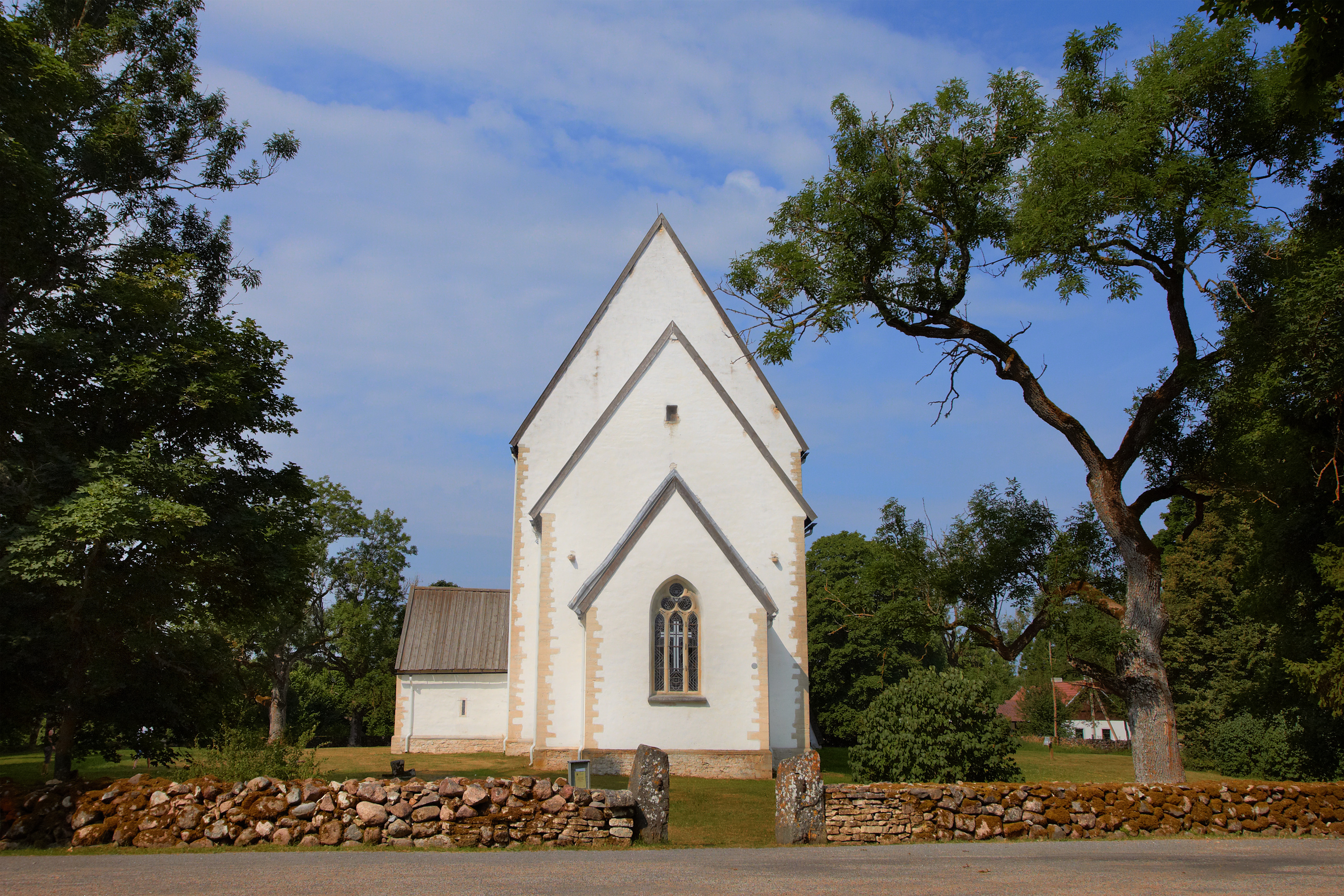
Rear view of church

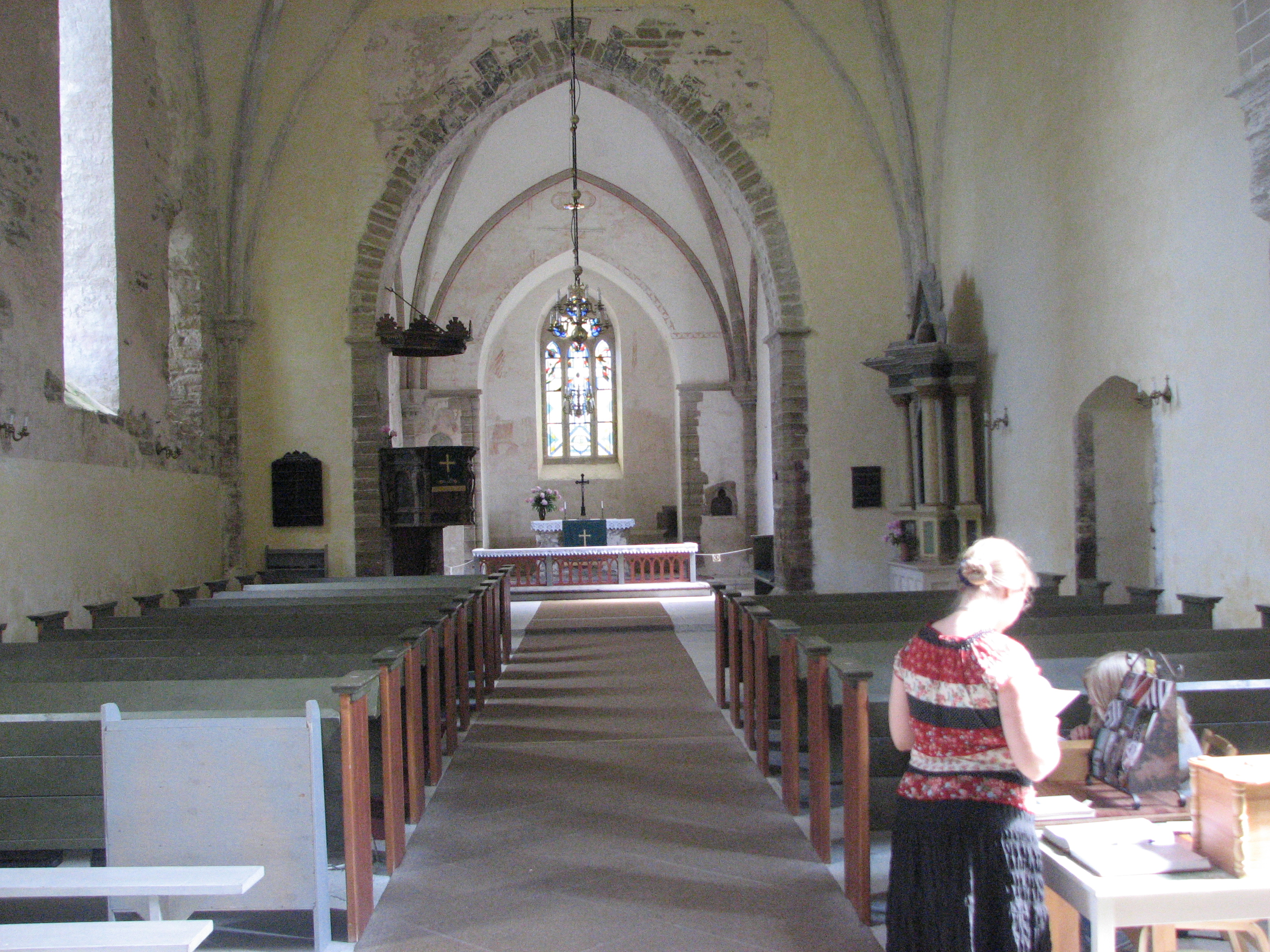
Inside view of church

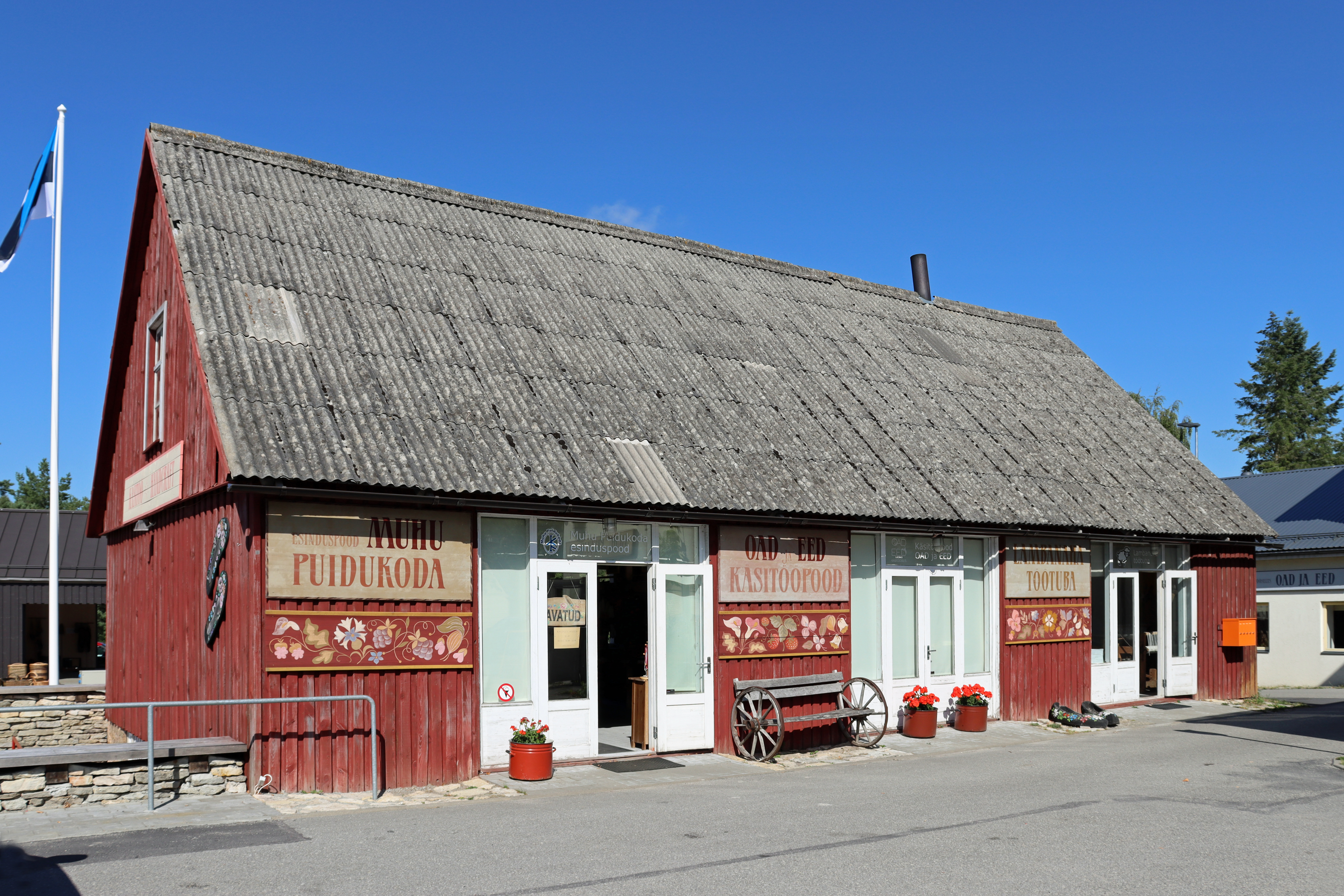
Handicraft shop in Liiva

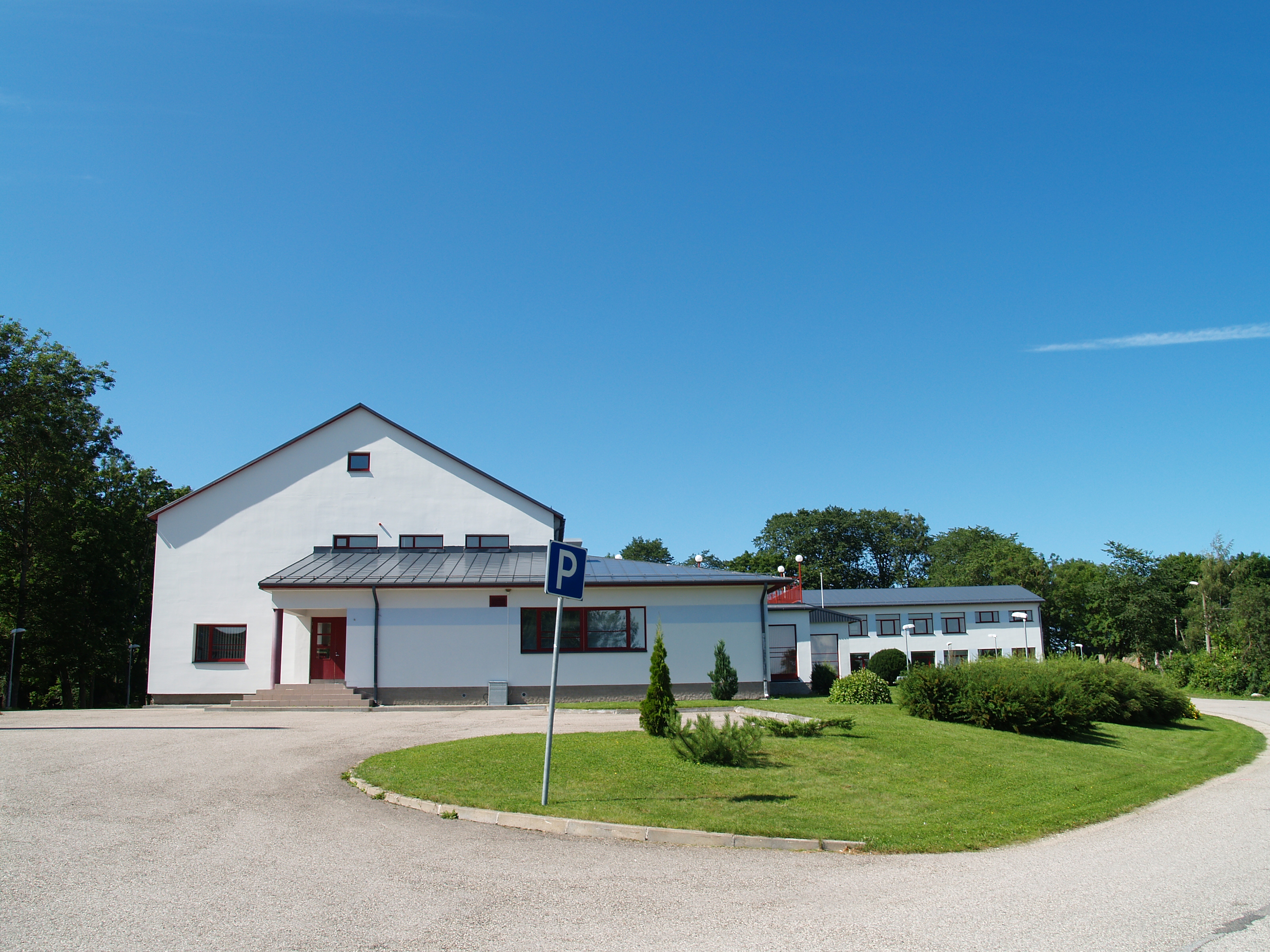
Muhu Primary School in Liiva

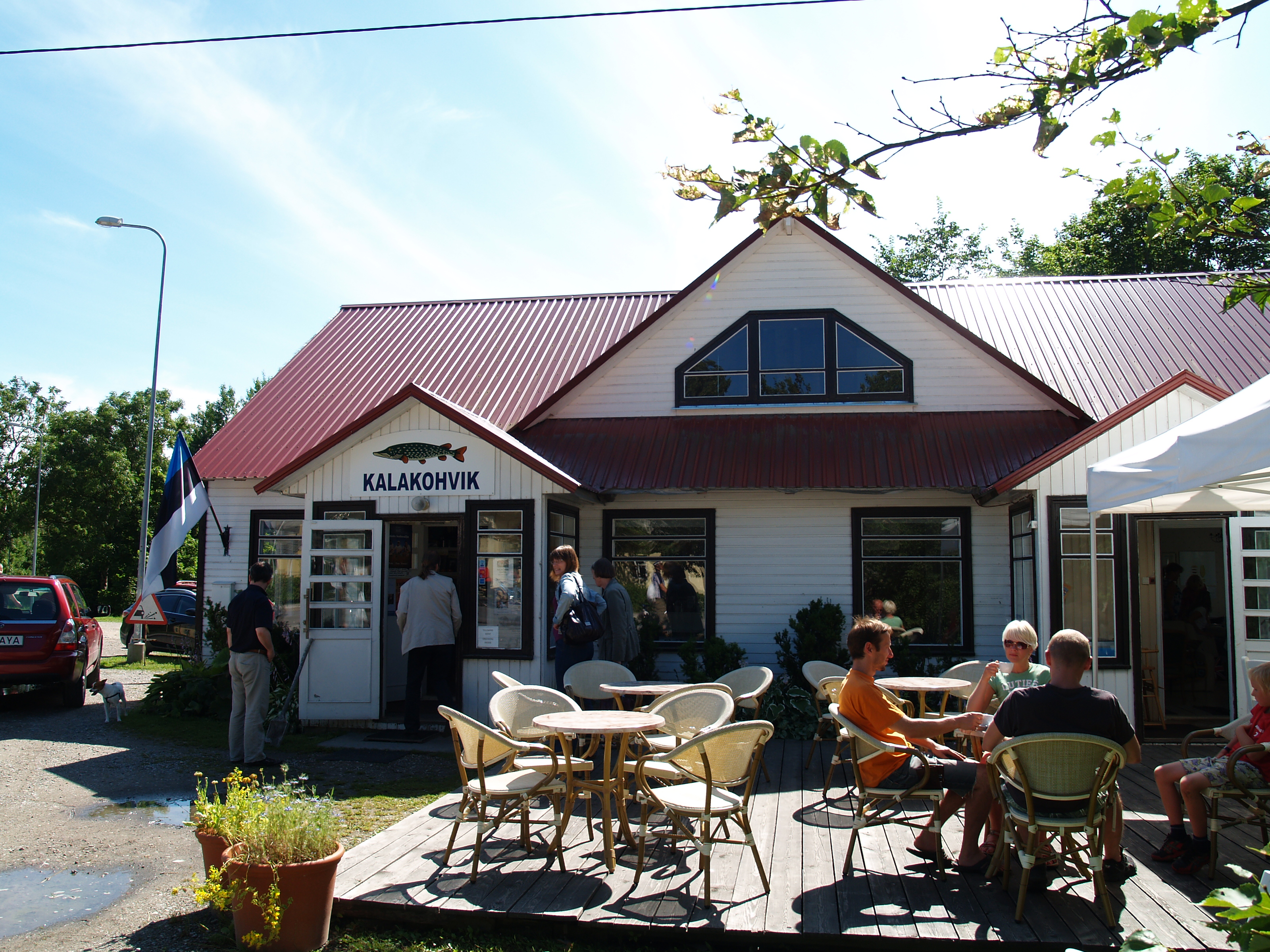
Cafe in Liiva

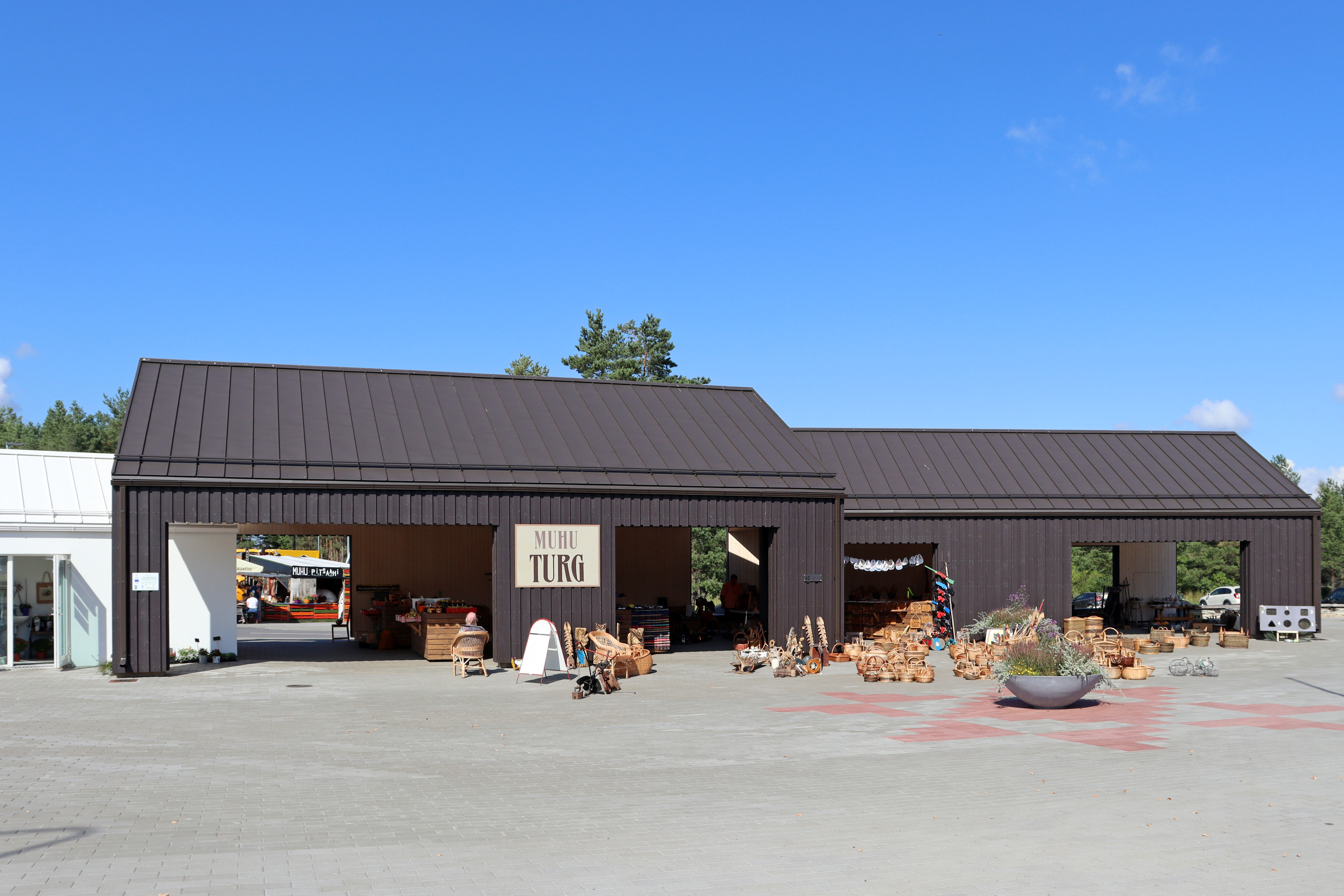
Liiva market

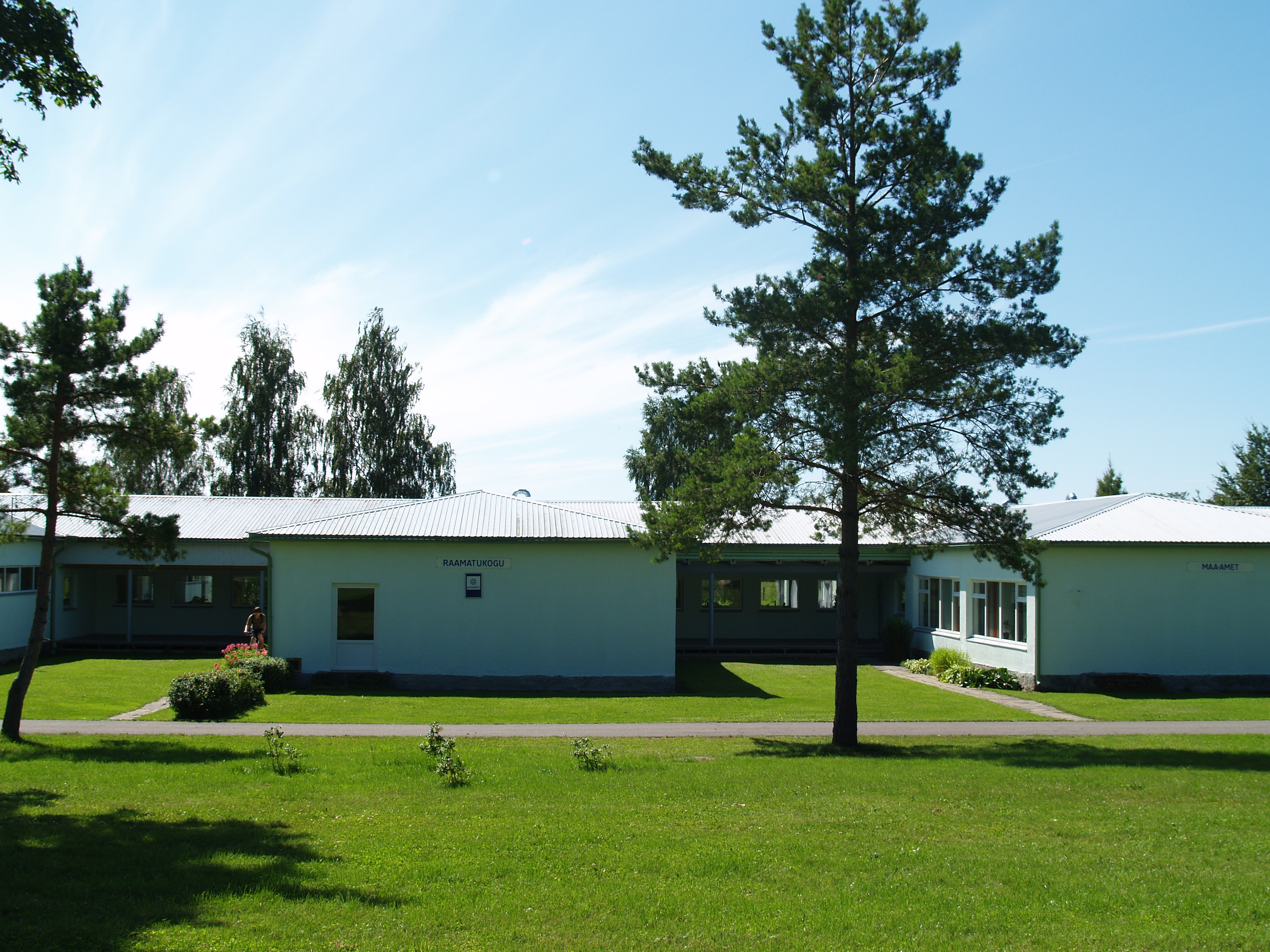
Liiva library
