= Nikolai Kann =

Estonian politician (1873–1948)

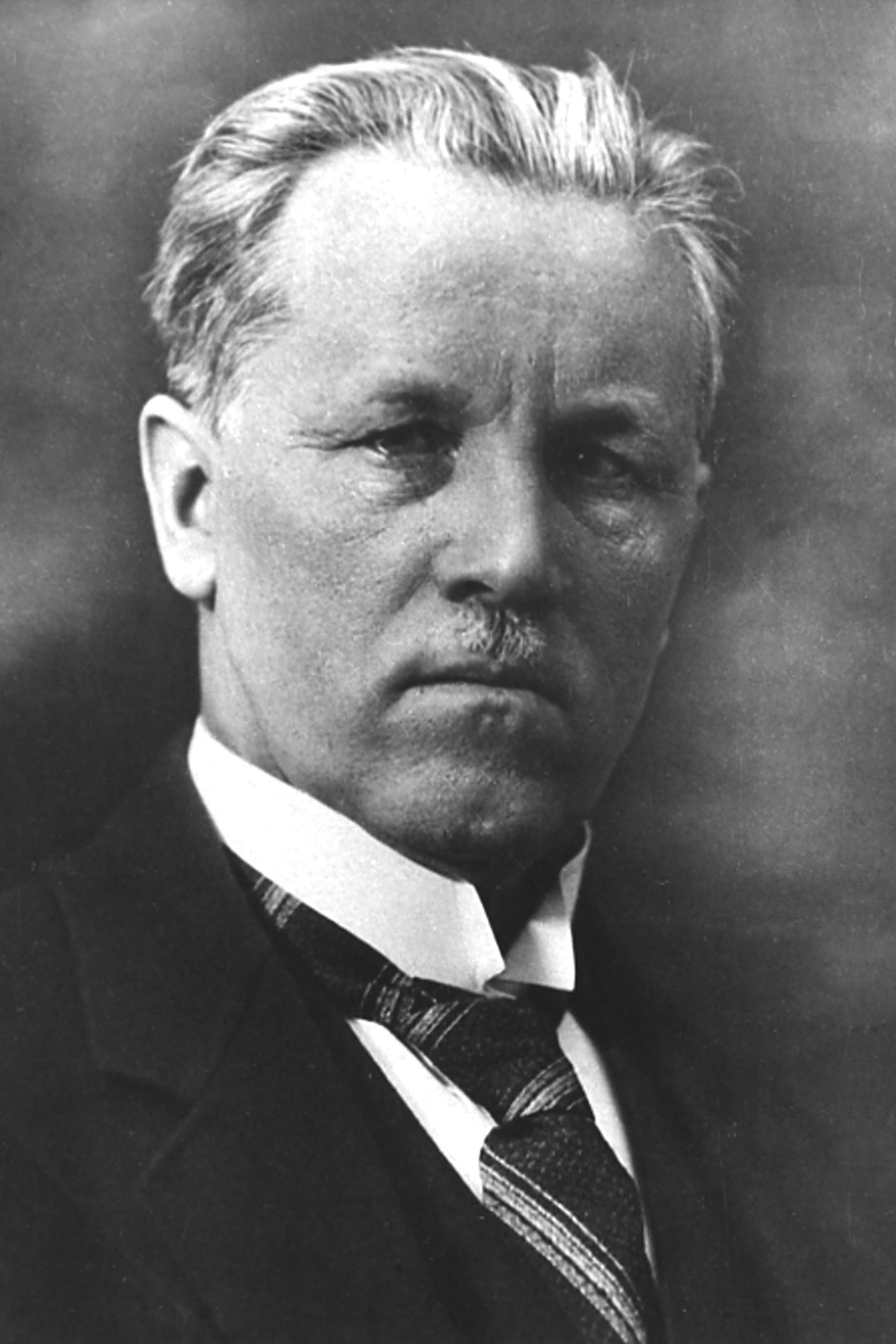
Nikolai Kann

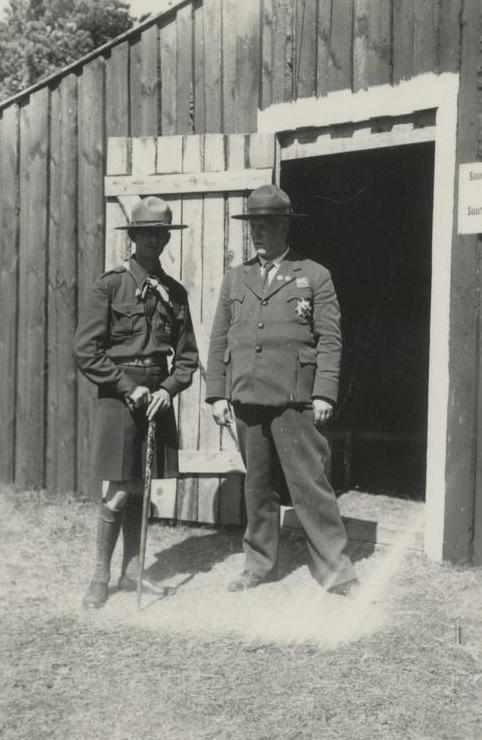
Nikolai Kann, first Estonian Chief Scout (1921)

Nikolai Kann (26 April 1873, Rinsi, Kreis Ösel, Governorate of Livonia – 17 February 1948 Göttingen, British occupation zone in Germany) was an Estonian educator and politician. He was a member of the Estonian Constituent Assembly, representing the Christian People's Party.

1920 he was Minister of Education. After the first Estonian Scout Conference held in Tartu in March 1921, was elected Estonian Chief Scout in December 1921. He occupied that post until his death in exile, in Germany, 1948.
