= Timotheus Kuusik =

Estonian teacher, councilman

Timotheus Kuusik (5 January 1863 – 14 May 1940), also known as Timotheos Kuusik or Timofei Kuusik, was an Estonian school teacher, author, translator, editor and councilman. He was born on 5 January 1863 in Lalli, a village on the island of Muhu. He was elected to the Estonian Provincial Assembly, which governed the Autonomous Governorate of Estonia between 1917 and 1919, and served the full term as a member of the assembly. He did not sit in the newly formed Republic of Estonia's Asutav Kogu (Constituent Assembly) or its Riigikogu (Parliament). He died on 14 May 1940 in Tallinn.

Kuusik was the author, translator or editor of more than six dozen publications in Estonian and Russian. He wrote children's primers and story books, translated Aesop's Fables into Estonian, authored the first Estonian-Russian-Estonian dictionary (published 1903), translated famous English poet John Milton's Paradise Lost into Estonian (1895), translated some of Count Leo Tolstoy's works and books about Peter the Great into Estonian, authored various articles about literature and edited Estonian folk song and church hymn lyrics, etc. Kuusik had eight children.
