= Muhu St. Catherine's Church =

Church building in Estonia

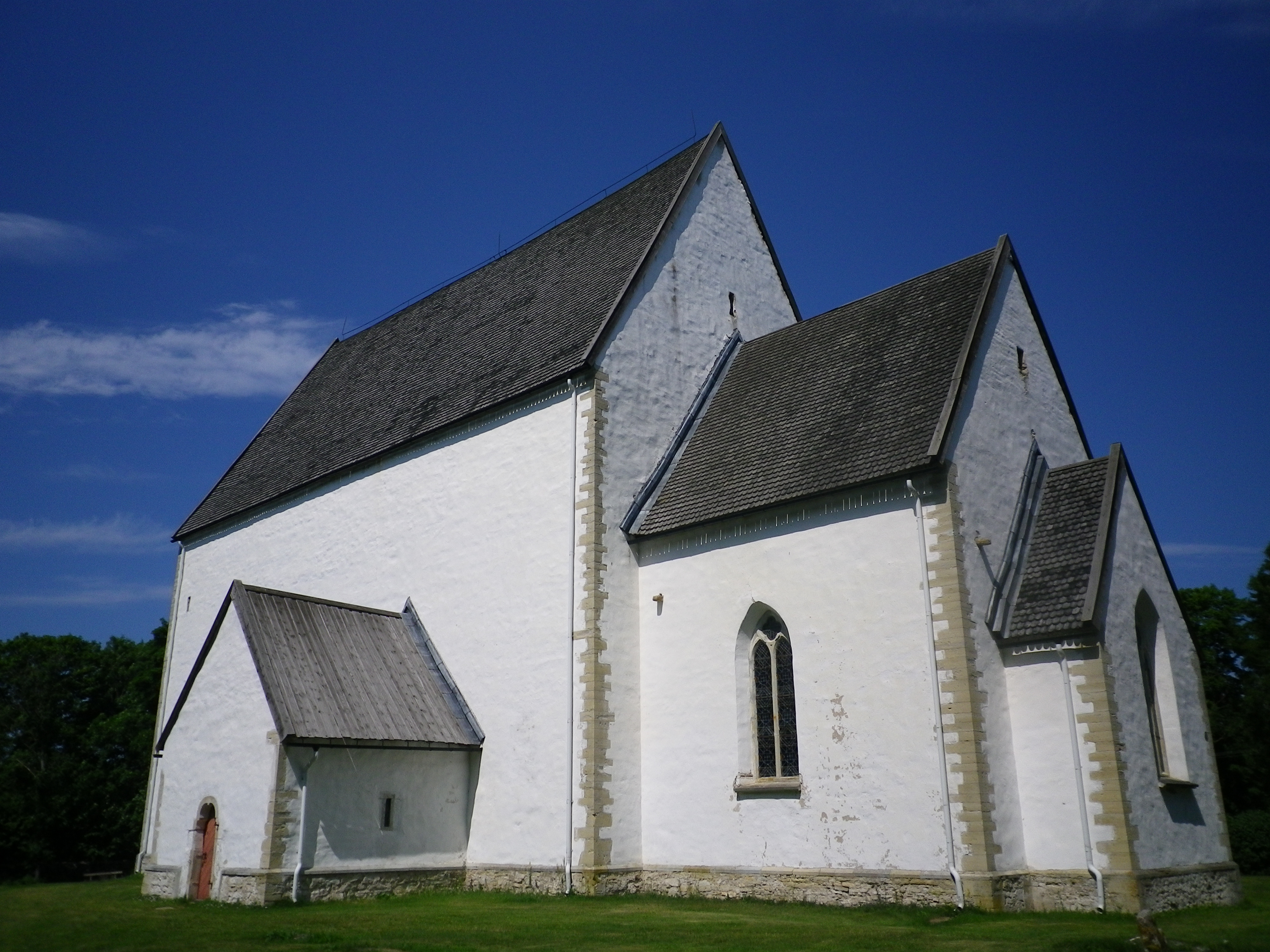
- Muhu church, façade

- Location within Estonia
- 58°36′14″N 23°13′34″E
- Country: Estonia
- Denomination: Lutheran

History
- Founded: 1267
- Founder: Otto von Lutterberg

Architecture
- Style: Gothic

Administration
- Parish: Muhu Parish

Muhu St. Catherine's Church, (Estonian: Muhu Katariina kirik) sometimes simply Muhu Church, is a medieval Lutheran church on Muhu island, in Saare County, Estonia.

== History ==
The church was founded by the master of the Livonian Order Otto von Lutterberg in 1267. The founding of the church is mentioned in a medieval chronicle by Hermann von Wartberge. The first church was probably made of wood and only replaced by the current stone building in the final years of the 13th century. It was built in stages, with the walls of the nave constructed first. The master builders involved with building the nearby Karja church were apparently also at work here, as their builders' marks have been found in the stones used to construct the church. A window in the west wall and the base of the altar dates from this period. Somewhat later are the murals, and considerably later are both the pulpit (1629, by Balthasar Raschky) and the retable (1827).

The church suffered damage throughout history. It was damaged by a fire in 1640, and during the Great Northern War. In 1941, the church was bombed in a German air raid and that destroyed the roof, which was not replaced until 1958. The period without a proper roof, coupled with unsuccessful attempts at restoration during the Soviet times, resulted in irreparable damage to the murals of the church. Following Estonia's re-establishment of independence in 1991, a proper renovation was carried out with substantial financial aid from Sweden.

== Architecture ==
The church is one of the simplest in form of the medieval churches of the West Estonian archipelago. It is a single-nave church, with high whitewashed vaults and a simple choir, and lacking both tower and sacristy. The church also lacks the relatively rich carved-stone décor which can be found in comparable churches nearby, e.g. Valjala church. The most notable feature of the church is the mural paintings. These were discovered only in 1913, when plaster from the time of the Reformation was removed. The murals depict scenes from the Last Judgement. It is thought that the artist came from Gotland, as the murals show strong similarities with paintings from the island from the same time. The influence of Byzantine art is noticeable. Unfortunately, only fragments remain today.

== Gallery ==
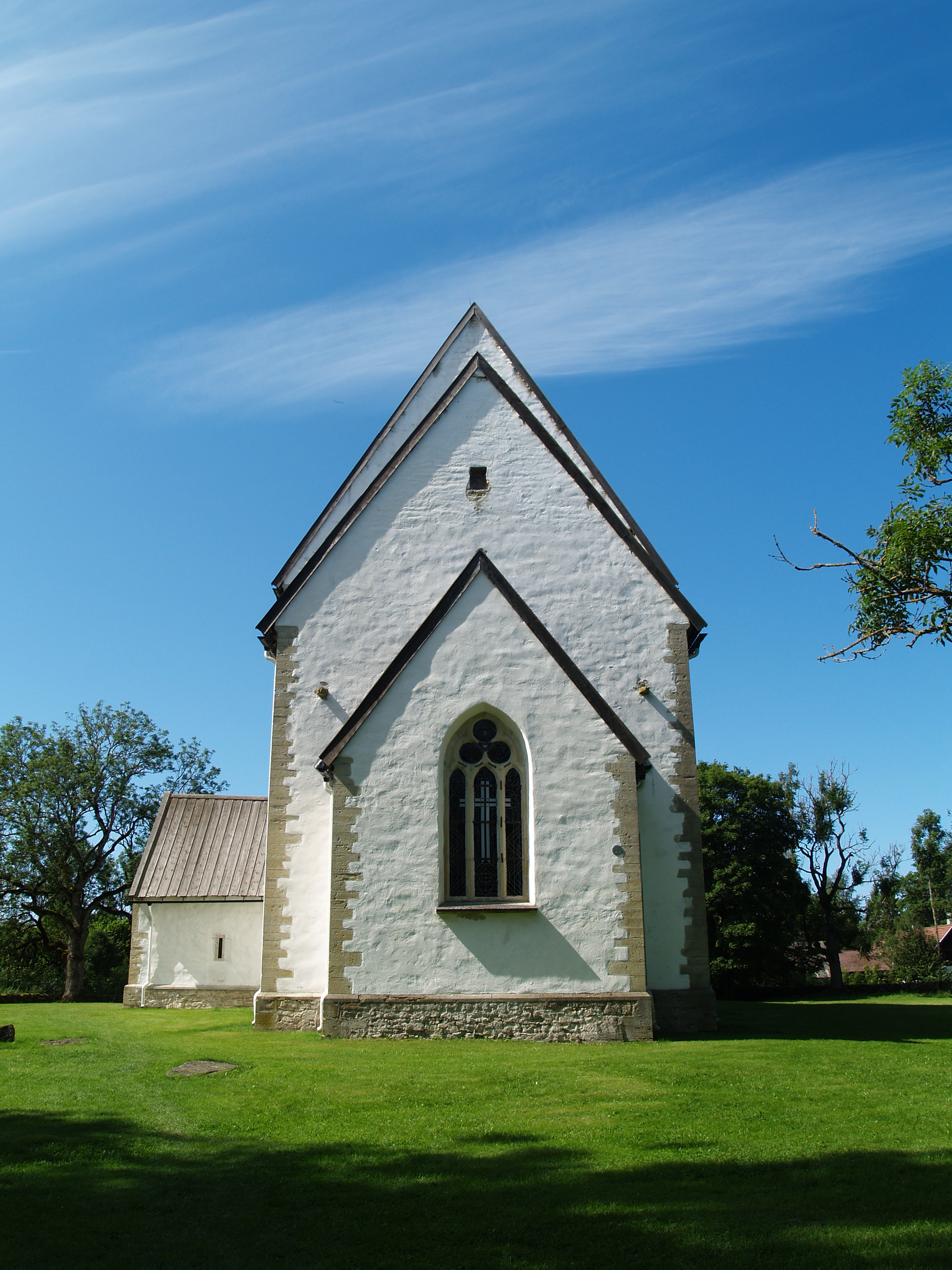
Church

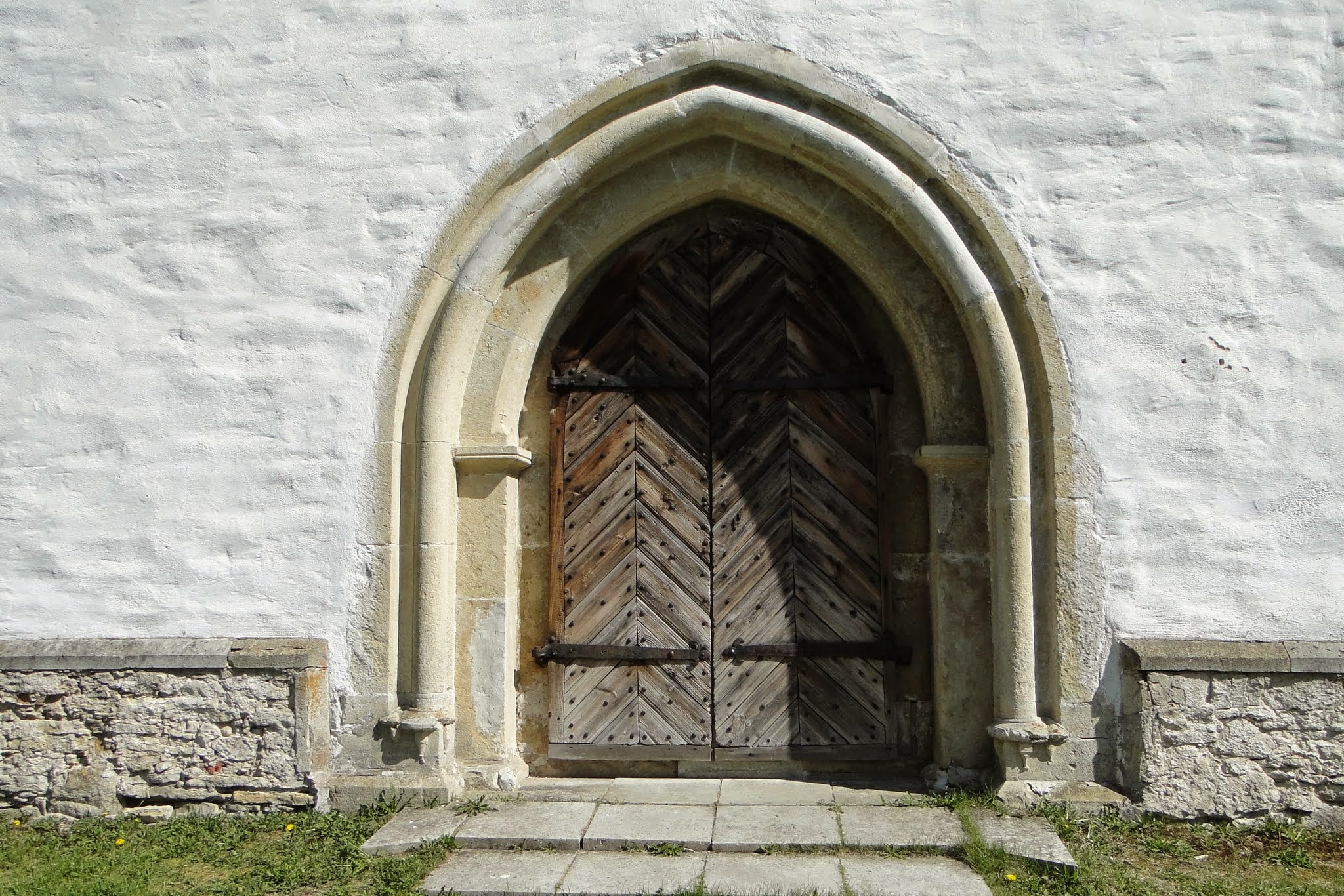
Main gate

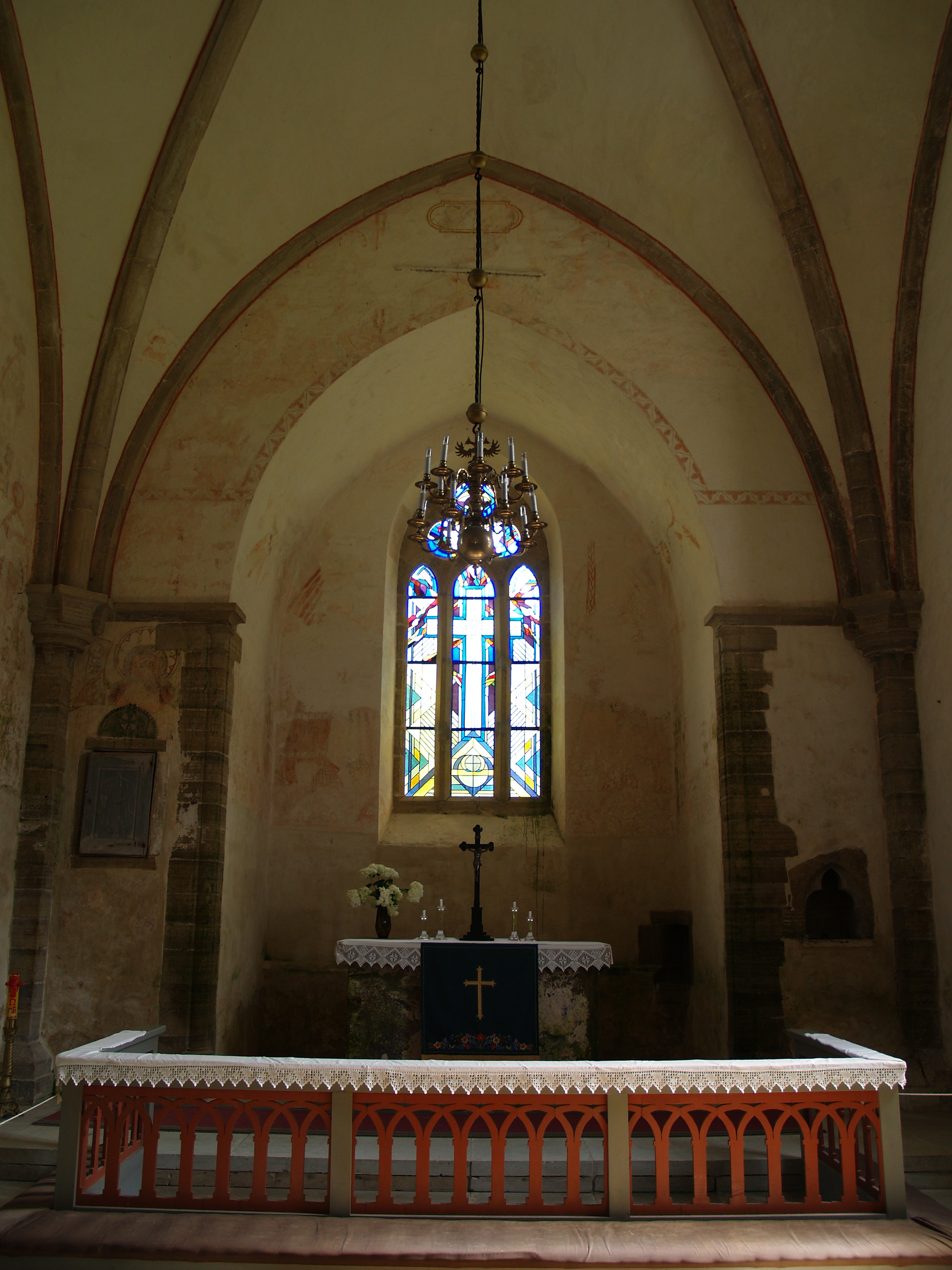
Altar

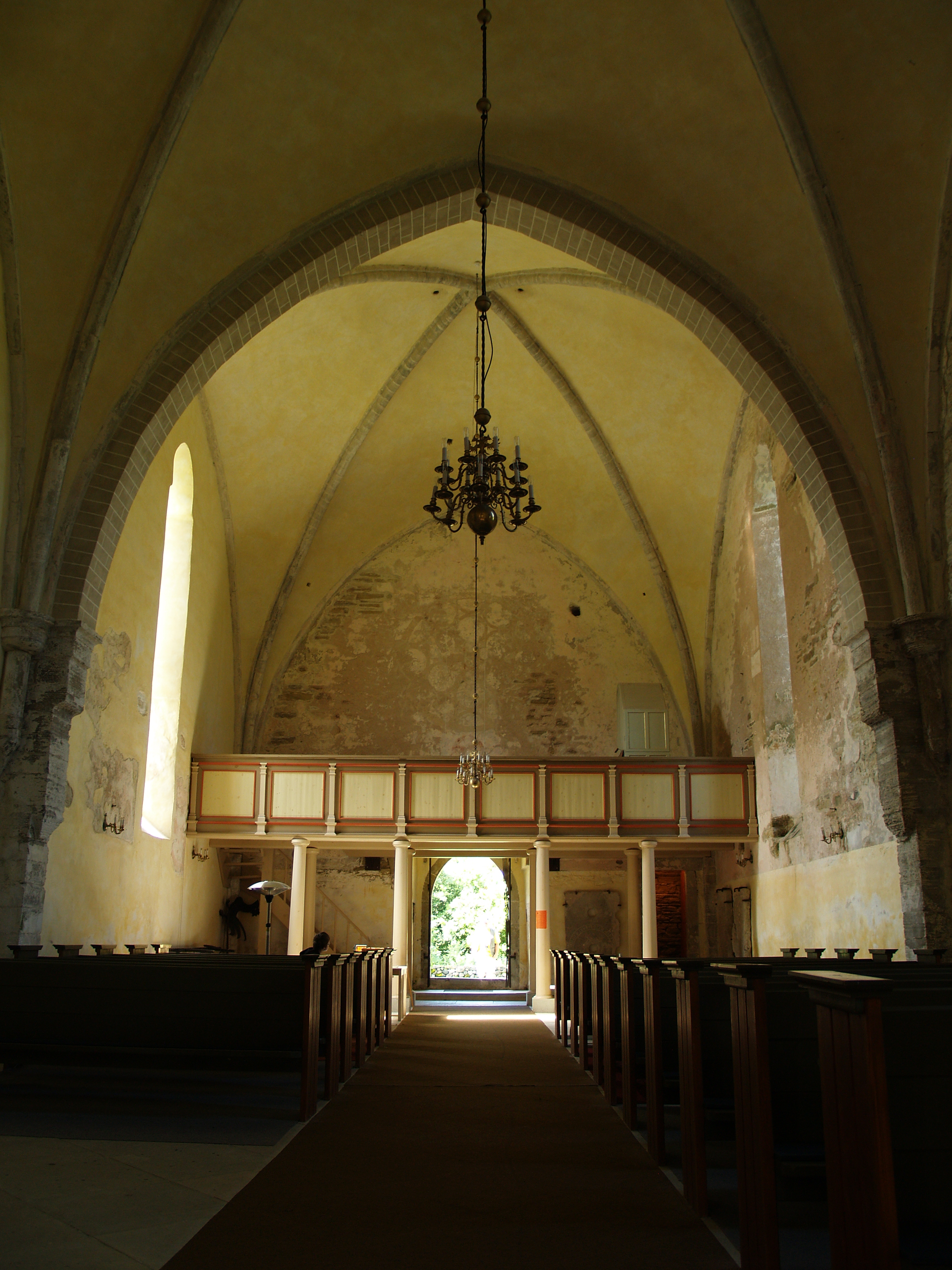
Interior

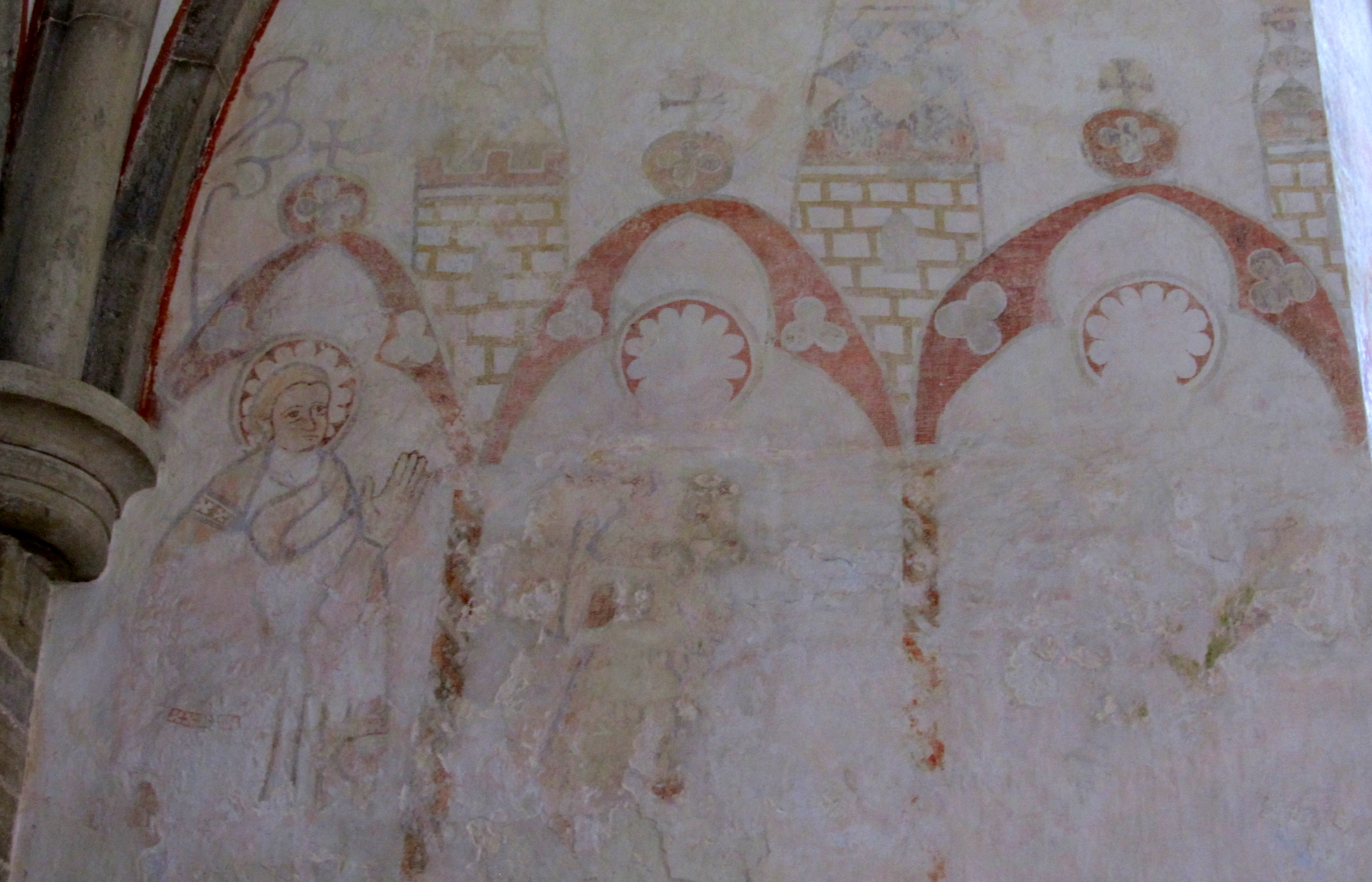
Murals

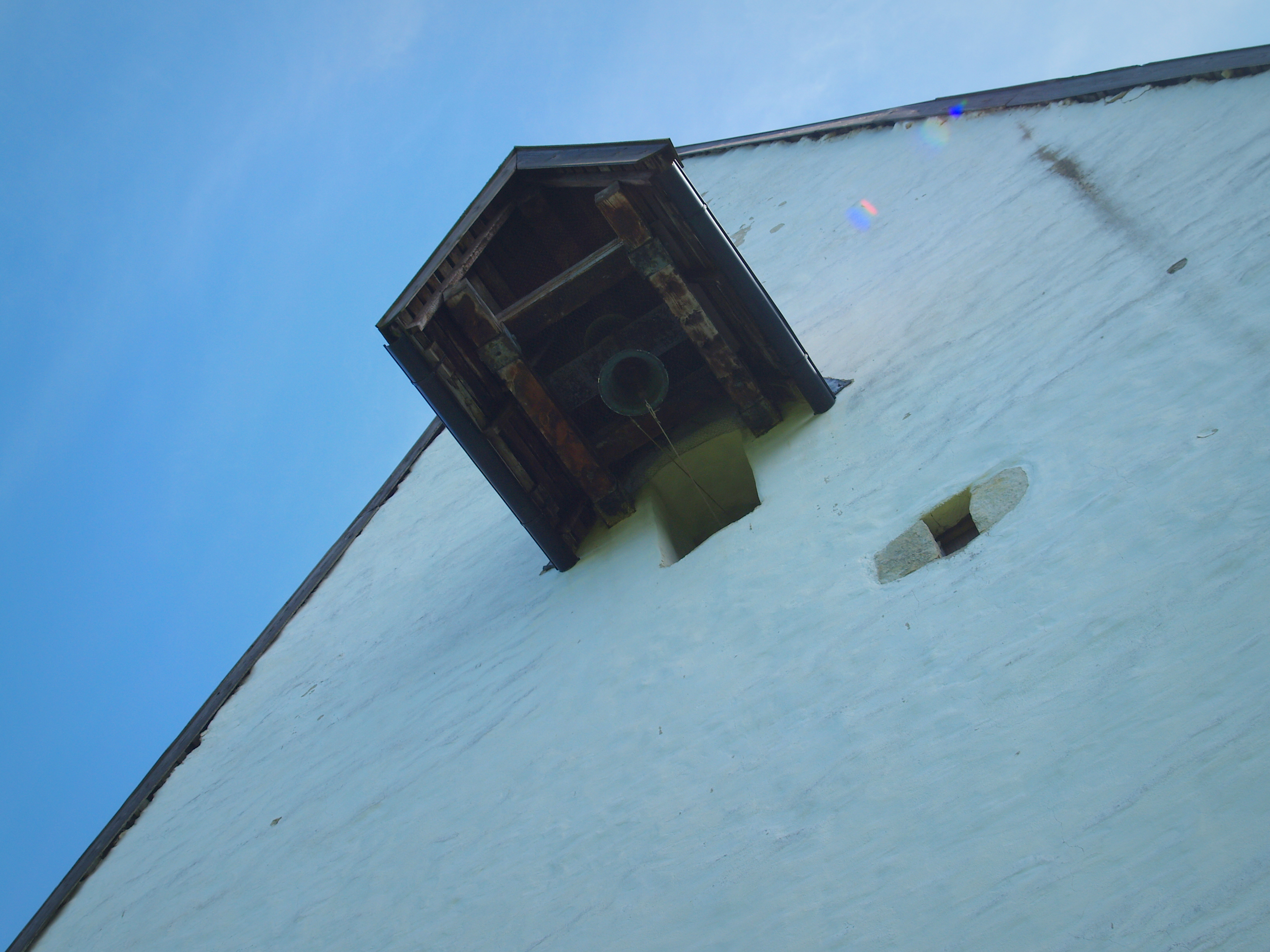
Bell

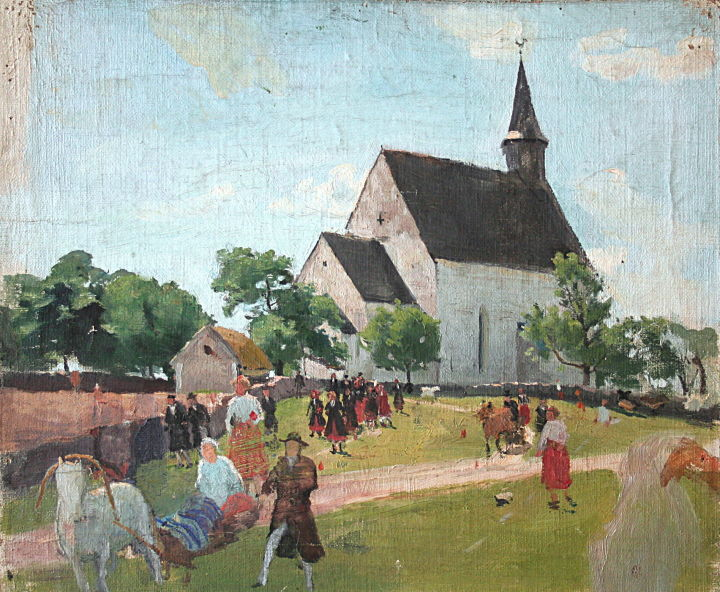
Muhu kirik by Paul Raud (1898)

== See also ==
- Architecture of Estonia
- List of churches in Estonia
