= Lalli, Saare County =

Village in Estonia

Coordinates: 58°37′32″N 23°21′05″E

Lalli
- Village
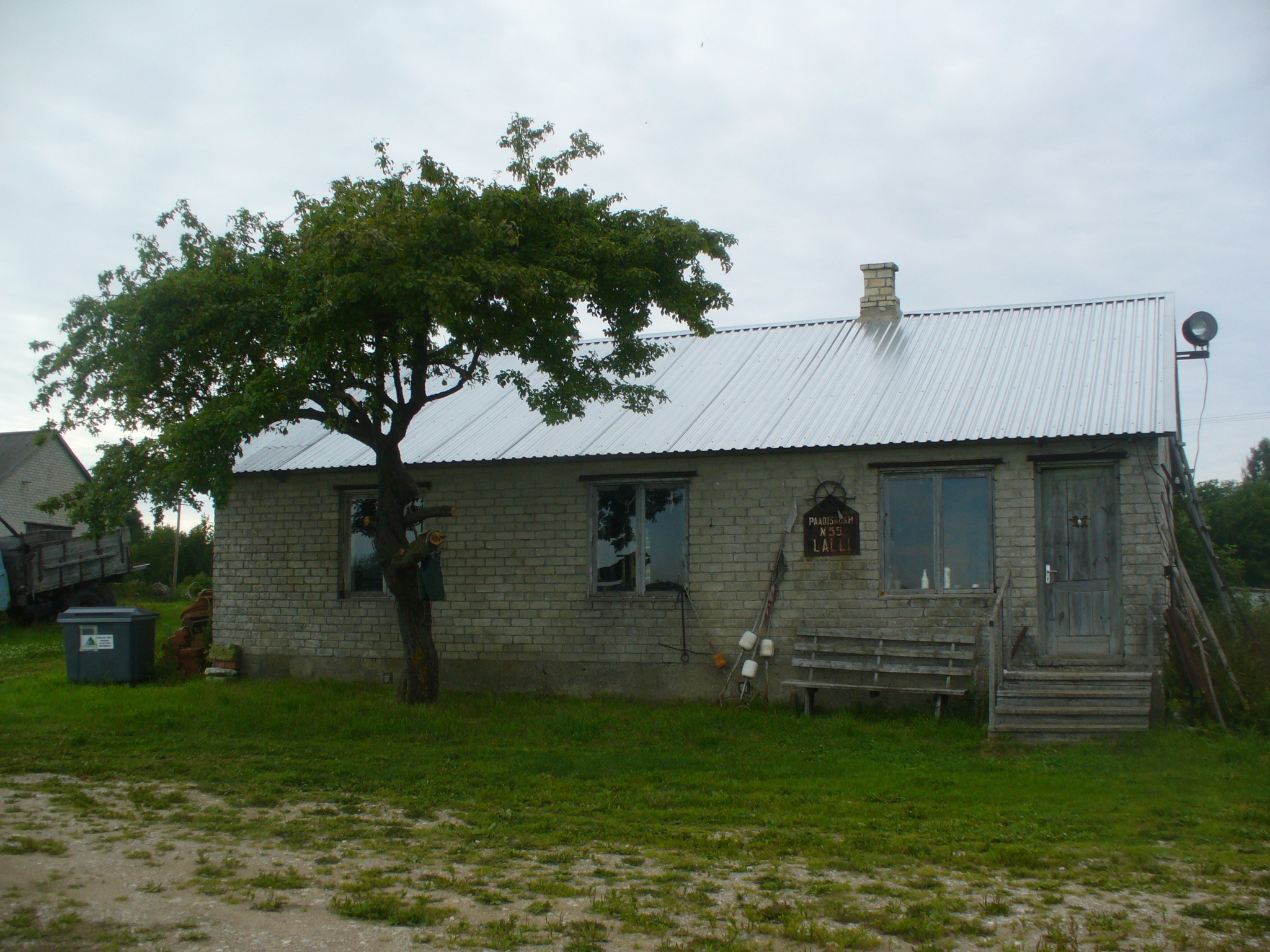
- Lalli harbour building
- Interactive map of Lalli
- Country: Estonia
- County: Saare County
- Parish: Muhu Parish
- Time zone: UTC+2 (EET)
  - Summer (DST): UTC+3 (EEST)

Lalli is a village in Muhu Parish, Saare County in western Estonia.

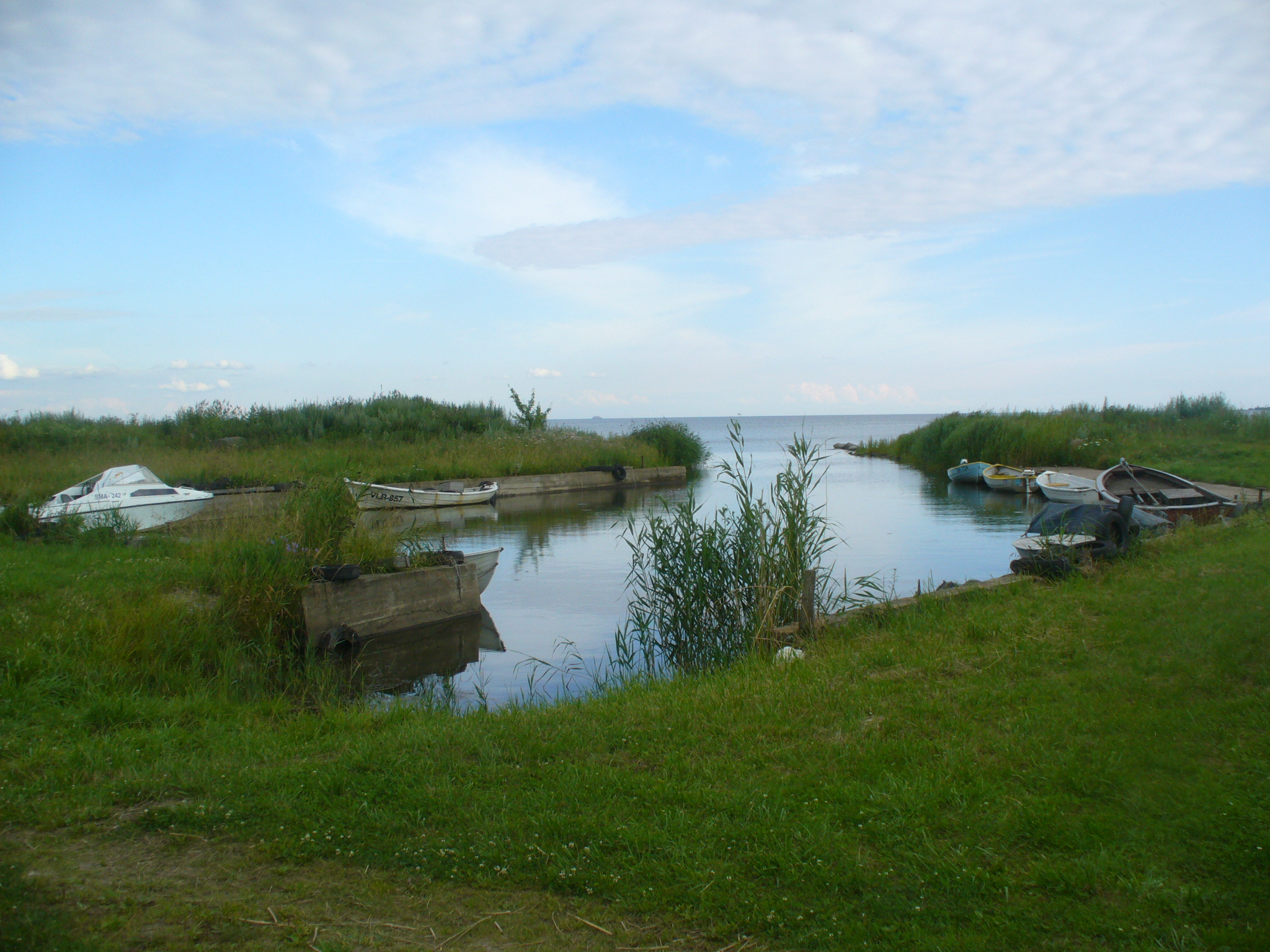
Lalli harbour
