= Raegma =

Village in Estonia

Coordinates: 58°34′N 23°18′E

- Village
- Interactive map of Raegma
- Country: Estonia
- County: Saare County
- Parish: Muhu Parish
- Time zone: UTC+2 (EET)
  - Summer (DST): UTC+3 (EEST)

Raegma is a village in Muhu Parish, Saare County in western Estonia. Its geographical coordinates are 58° 33' 44" N, 23° 18' 5" E, and its original name (with diacritics) is Räegma.
