= Rannaküla, Muhu Parish =

Village in Estonia

Coordinates: 58°38′51″N 23°08′36″E

Rannaküla
- Village
- Interactive map of Rannaküla
- Country: Estonia
- County: Saare County
- Parish: Muhu Parish
- Time zone: UTC+2 (EET)
  - Summer (DST): UTC+3 (EEST)

Rannaküla is a village in Muhu Parish, Saare County in western Estonia.

== See also ==
- List of villages in Estonia
