= Vanamõisa, Muhu Parish =

Village in Estonia

Coordinates: 58°35′36″N 23°12′05″E

Vanamõisa
- Village
- Interactive map of Vanamõisa
- Country: Estonia
- County: Saare County
- Parish: Muhu Parish
- Time zone: UTC+2 (EET)
  - Summer (DST): UTC+3 (EEST)

Vanamõisa is a village in Muhu Parish, Saare County in western Estonia.
