= Kantsi =

Village in Estonia

Coordinates: 58°35′33″N 23°14′23″E

- Village
- Interactive map of Kantsi
- Country: Estonia
- County: Saare County
- Parish: Muhu Parish
- Time zone: UTC+2 (EET)
  - Summer (DST): UTC+3 (EEST)

Kantsi is a village in Muhu Parish, Saare County in western Estonia.
