= Päelda =

Village in Estonia

Coordinates: 58°37′N 23°13′E

- Village
- Interactive map of Päelda
- Country: Estonia
- County: Saare County
- Parish: Muhu Parish
- Time zone: UTC+2 (EET)
  - Summer (DST): UTC+3 (EEST)

Päelda is a village in Muhu Parish, Saare County in western Estonia.
