= Kallaste, Muhu Parish =

Village in Estonia

Coordinates: 58°40′02″N 23°14′22″E

Kallaste
- Village
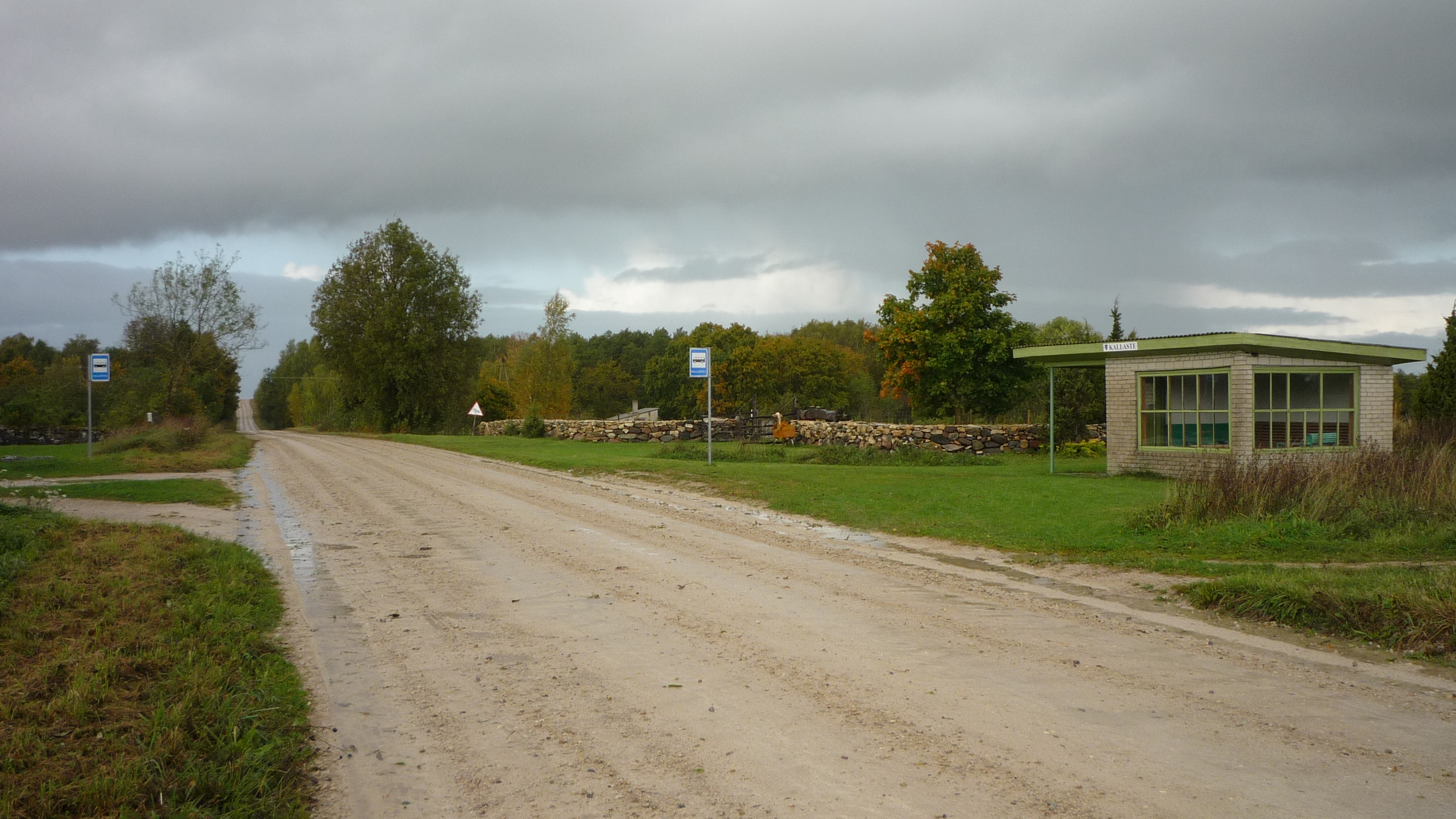
- Bus stop in Kallaste
- Interactive map of Kallaste
- Country: Estonia
- County: Saare County
- Parish: Muhu Parish
- Time zone: UTC+2 (EET)
  - Summer (DST): UTC+3 (EEST)

Kallaste is a village in Muhu Parish, Saare County in western Estonia.

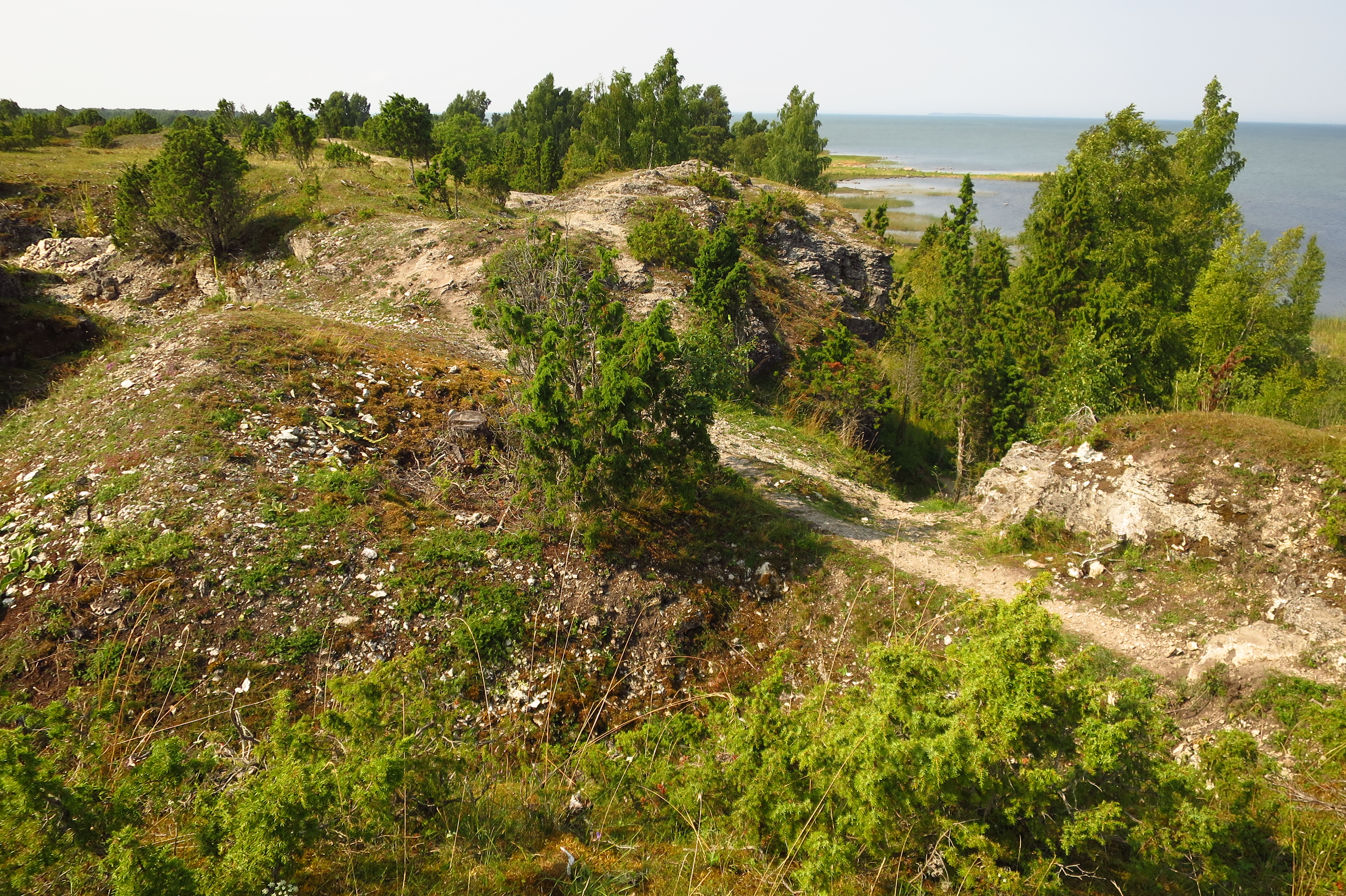
Üügu bank in Kallaste
