= Nautse =

Village in Estonia

Coordinates: 58°35′N 23°10′E

- Village
- Interactive map of Nautse
- Country: Estonia
- County: Saare County
- Parish: Muhu Parish
- Time zone: UTC+2 (EET)
  - Summer (DST): UTC+3 (EEST)

Nautse is a village in Muhu Parish, Saare County in western Estonia.
