= Viira, Muhu Parish =

Village in Estonia

Coordinates: 58°36′12″N 23°13′02″E

Viira
- Village
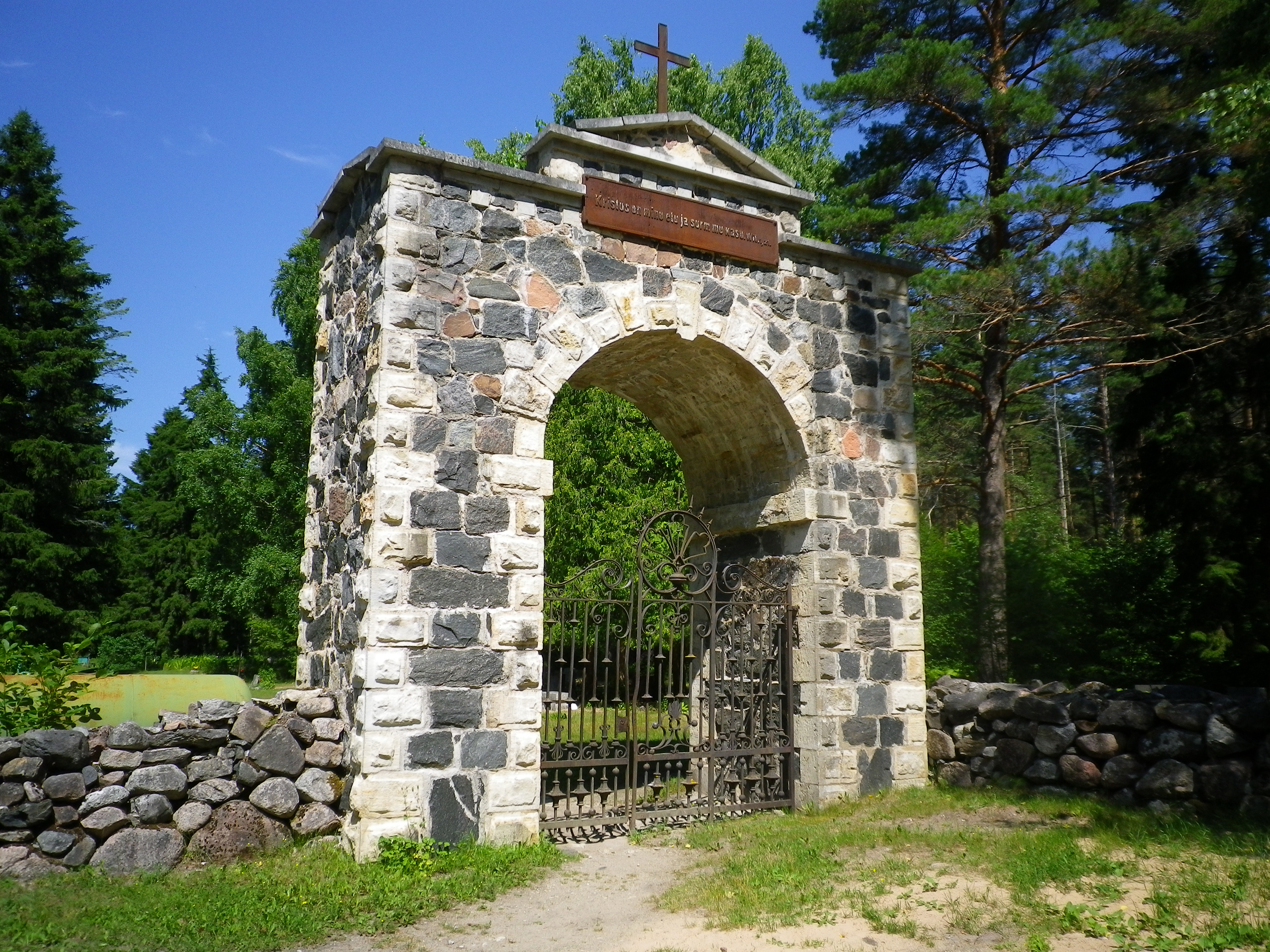
- Interactive map of Viira
- Country: Estonia
- County: Saare
- Parish: Muhu
- Time zone: UTC+2 (EET)
  - Summer (DST): UTC+3 (EEST)

Viira is a village in Muhu Parish, Saare County in western Estonia.
