= Igaküla =

Village in Estonia

Coordinates: 58°36′N 23°07′E

- Village
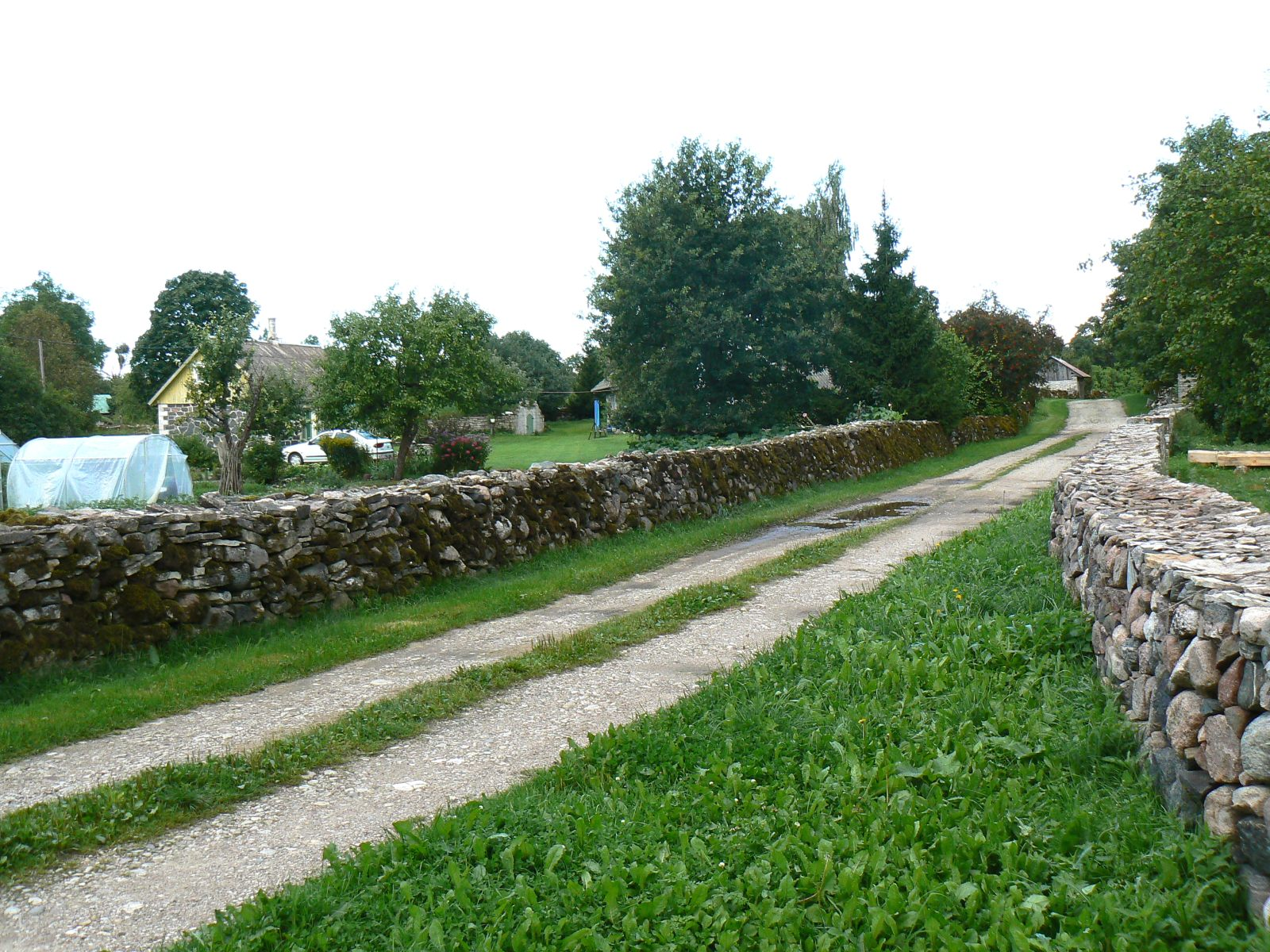
- Street through Igaküla
- Interactive map of Igaküla
- Country: Estonia
- County: Saare County
- Parish: Muhu Parish
- Time zone: UTC+2 (EET)
  - Summer (DST): UTC+3 (EEST)

Igaküla is a village in Muhu Parish, Saare County in western Estonia.
