= Alexander Schmidt (physiologist) =

Baltic German physiologist (1831–1894)

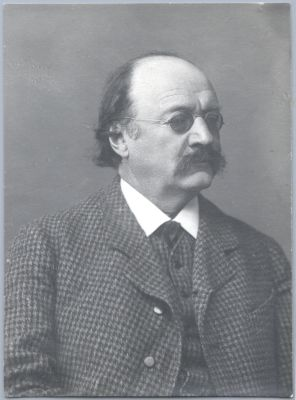
- Born: 27 May [O.S. 15] 1831; Mohn, Governorate of Livonia, Russian Empire
- Died: 22 April [O.S. 10] 1894 (aged 62); Dorpat, Russian Empire
- Education: Imperial University of Dorpat; Friedrich Wilhelm University; University of Vienna
- Scientific career
- Fields: Physiology
- Workplaces: Imperial University of Dorpat

Hermann Adolf Alexander Schmidt (27 May [O.S. 15] 1831 – 22 April [O.S. 10] 1894) was a Baltic German physiologist from what was then the Governorate of Livonia in the Russian Empire. He was born on the island of Moon, which is today known by its Estonian name Muhu, in present-day Estonia.

In 1858, he received his medical doctorate from the Imperial University of Dorpat, and later was an assistant to Felix Hoppe-Seyler (1825-1895) in Berlin, and to Carl Ludwig (1816-1895) in Leipzig. In 1869 he succeeded Friedrich Bidder (1810-1894) as professor of physiology at Dorpat, where he remained for the rest of his life. From 1885 to 1889 he served as university rector.

Schmidt is remembered for his research involving the process of blood coagulation by demonstrating that the transformation of fibrinogen into fibrin was the result of an enzymatic process. He named the hypothetical enzyme "thrombin", and he called its precursor "prothrombin". Schmidt is credited for providing a foundation for the creation of anti-coagulation systems and towards the development of blood transfusion.

== Selected works ==
- Weiteres über den Faserstoff und die Ursachen seiner Gerinnung, 1862 – More information involving "faserstoff" and the causes of its coagulation.
- Ueber Ozon im Blut, 1862. (habilitation thesis for privat-docent). 1862 – On ozone in the blood.
- Beiträge zur Kenntniss der Milch, 1874 – Contributions to the understanding of milk.
- Die Lehre von den fermentativen Gerinnungserscheinungen in den eiweissartigen thierischen Körperflüssigkeiten, 1876. The doctrine of the fermentative coagulation phenomena in albuminous animal body fluids.
- Zur Blutlehre. Leipzig, F. C. W. Vogel, 1892 – Lessons on blood.

Preceded by Eduard von Wahl	Rector of the Imperial University of Dorpat; 1885–1890	Succeeded by Ottomar Meykov
