= Lõetsa =

Village in Estonia

Coordinates: 58°38′N 23°20′E

- Village
- Interactive map of Lõetsa
- Country: Estonia
- County: Saare County
- Parish: Muhu Parish
- Time zone: UTC+2 (EET)
  - Summer (DST): UTC+3 (EEST)

Lõetsa is a village in Muhu Parish, Saare County in western Estonia.
