= Piiri, Saare County =

Village in Estonia

Coordinates: 58°36′01″N 23°11′39″E

Piiri
- Village
- Interactive map of Piiri
- Country: Estonia
- County: Saare County
- Parish: Muhu Parish
- Time zone: UTC+2 (EET)
  - Summer (DST): UTC+3 (EEST)

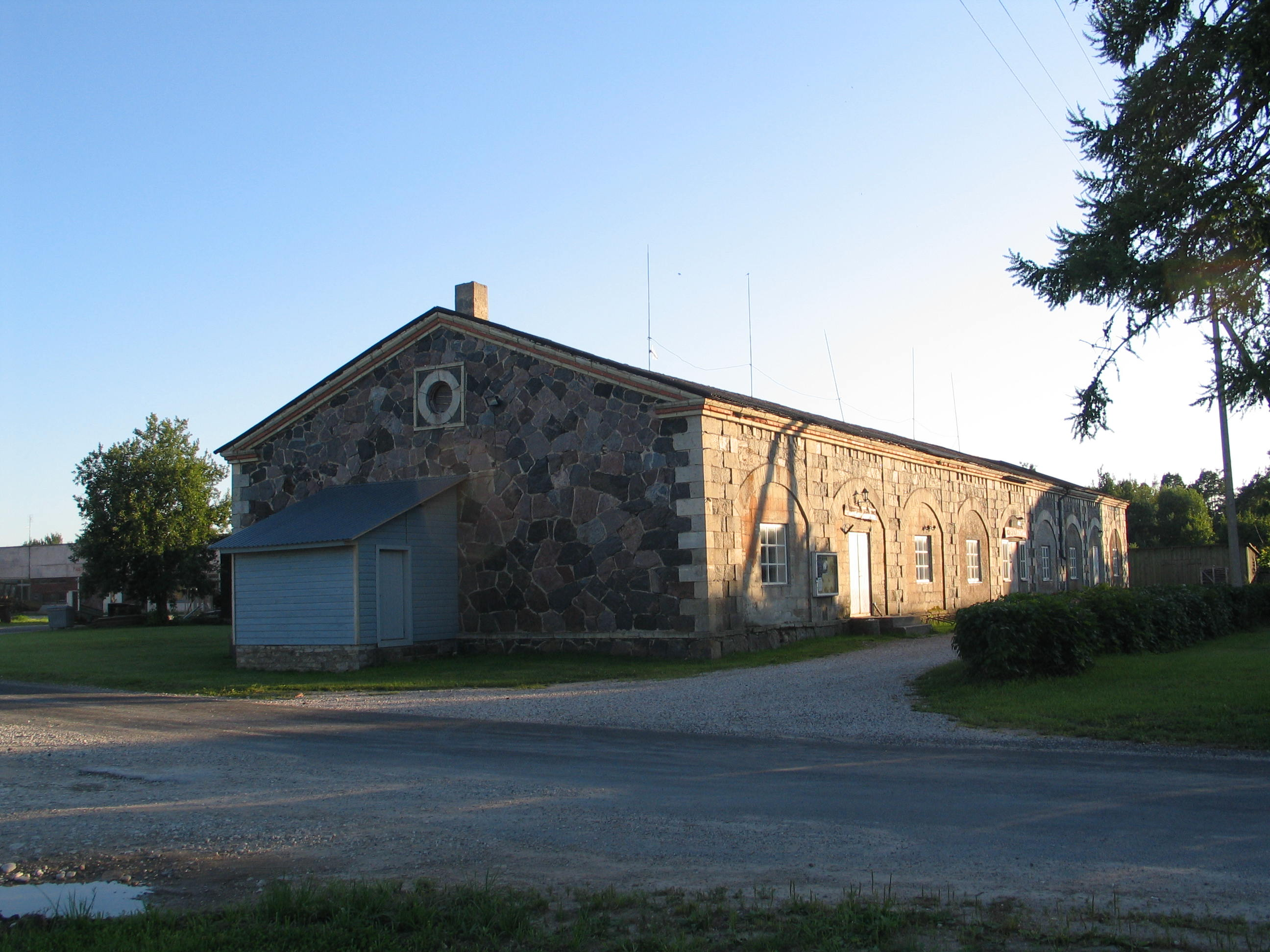
A communal granary in Piiri

Piiri is a village in Muhu Parish, Saare County in western Estonia.
