= Suuremõisa, Saare County =

Village in Estonia

Coordinates: 58°34′17″N 23°14′03″E

Suuremõisa
- Village
- Interactive map of Suuremõisa
- Country: Estonia
- County: Saare County
- Parish: Muhu Parish
- Time zone: UTC+2 (EET)
  - Summer (DST): UTC+3 (EEST)

Suuremõisa is a village in Muhu Parish, Saare County in western Estonia.
