= Linnuse, Muhu Parish =

Village in Estonia

Coordinates: 58°34′39″N 23°10′56″E

Linnuse
- Village
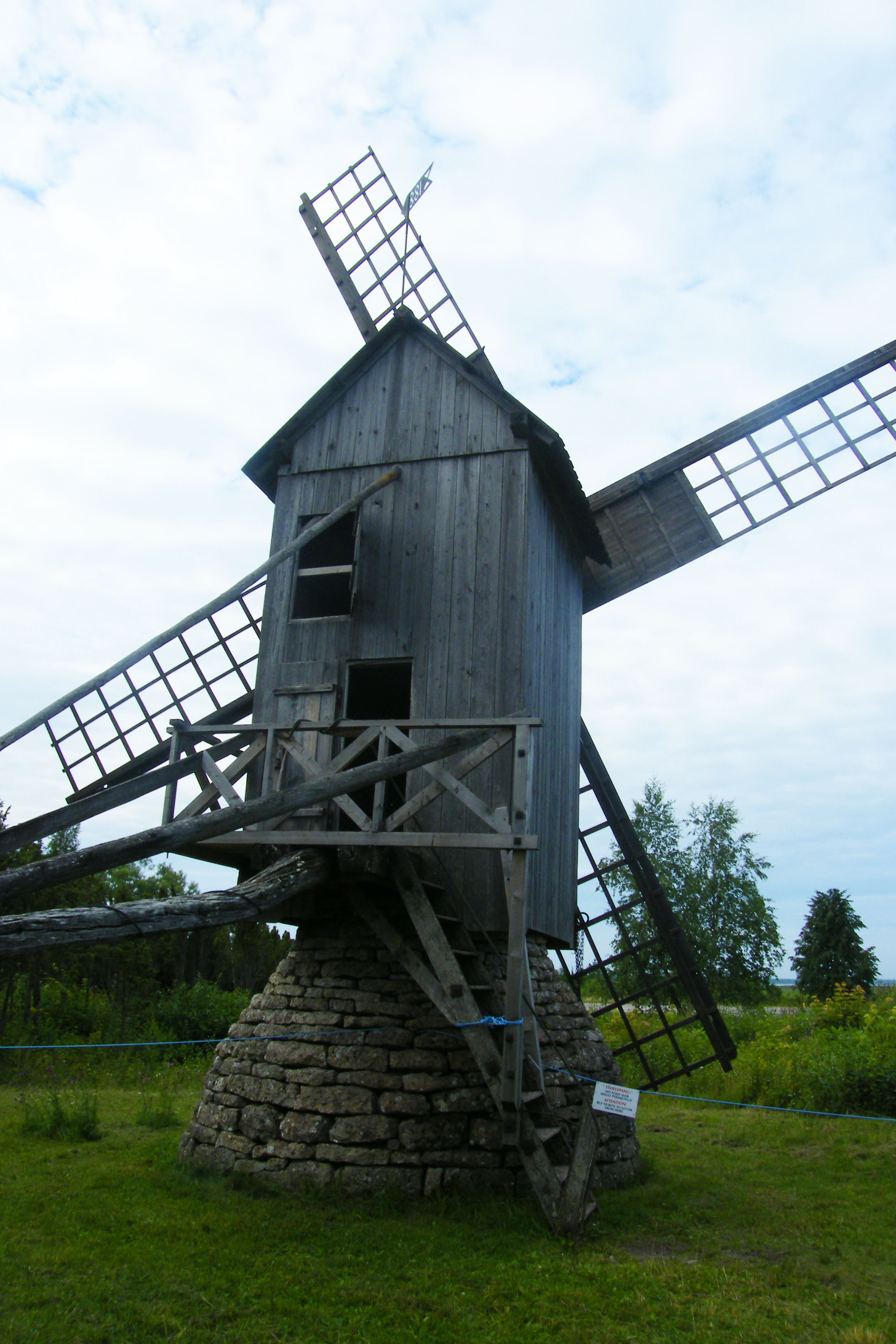
- Eemu windmill in Linnuse
- Interactive map of Linnuse
- Country: Estonia
- County: Saare County
- Parish: Muhu Parish
- Time zone: UTC+2 (EET)
  - Summer (DST): UTC+3 (EEST)

Linnuse is a village in Muhu Parish, Saare County in western Estonia.
