= Nurme, Muhu Parish =

Village in Estonia

Coordinates: 58°34′40″N 23°12′35″E

Nurme
- Village
- Interactive map of Nurme
- Country: Estonia
- County: Saare County
- Parish: Muhu Parish
- Time zone: UTC+2 (EET)
  - Summer (DST): UTC+3 (EEST)

Nurme is a village in Muhu Parish, Saare County in western Estonia.
