= List of cathedrals in Estonia =

This is a list of cathedrals in Estonia sorted geographically.

Cathedral	City	Founded	Denomination	Diocese	Image	Coordinates
St. Mary's Cathedral, Tallinn	Tallinn	1240	Evangelical Lutheran Church	Archdiocese of Tallinn		59°26′14″N 24°44′20″E
Alexander Nevsky Cathedral	Tallinn	1900	Estonian Christian Orthodox Church	Archdiocese of Tallinn and All of Estonia		59°26′09″N 24°44′22″E
St Peter and St Paul's Cathedral	Tallinn	1844	Roman Catholic Church	Roman Catholic Diocese of Tallinn		59°26′17″N 24°44′56″E
St Simeon's and St Anne's Cathedral Church	Tallinn	1752	Apostolic Orthodox Church	Archdiocese of Tallinn and All of Estonia		59°26′24″N 24°45′37″E
Tartu Cathedral	Tartu	13th century	Roman Catholic Church	–		58°22′49″N 26°42′54″E
The Cathedral of the Dormition of Our Lady (Uspenski Church)	Tartu	1783	Apostolic Orthodox Church	Diocese of Tartu		58°22′58″N 26°43′20″E
Resurrection of Christ Cathedral	Narva	1890	Estonian Christian Orthodox Church	Diocese of Narva and Peipsiveere		59°22′16″N 28°11′36″E
Transformation of Our Lord Cathedral Church	Pärnu	1904	Apostolic Orthodox Church	Diocese of Pärnu and Saare		58°23′02″N 24°30′22″E
St Nicholas' Cathedral	Haapsalu	1260	Evangelical Lutheran Church	Diocese of the Western and Northern Region		58°56′50″N 23°32′19″E

== See also ==
- List of churches in Estonia
- List of cathedrals (international)
