= List of Catholic dioceses in Estonia =

The Catholic Church in Estonia (a Baltic former Soviet republic, like Latvia and Lithuania) presently comprises only one Diocese, covering (only) the entire country:

- Diocese of Tallinn, formed on 26 September 2024 after the Apostolic Administration of Estonia was raised to a diocese.

There are no Eastern Catholic or other Latin prelatures.

There formally is an Apostolic Nunciature (papal diplomatic representation, embassy-level) to Estonia, but it's vested (like that to Latvia) in the Apostolic Nunciature to Lithuania in its national capital Vilnius.

== Defunct Latin jurisdictions ==
There are no titular sees.

None of the following has a current direct successor in Estonia, some (at least canonically) one abroad.

Suppressed Livonian prince-bishoprics

- Diocese of Dorpat
- Diocese of Ösel–Wiek (alias Saare-Lääne; also known after successive sees as Leal (Lihula) from 1234, Perona (Vana-Pärnu) from 1251, Hapsal (Haapsalu) from 1279)

Suppressed non-princely Latin sees

- Diocese of Inflanty alias Wenden
- Diocese of Leal
- Diocese of Pärnu = Pernau (1251-1263)
- Diocese of Reval
- Diocese of Virumaa = Wierland (1220-1227)

== See also ==
- List of Catholic dioceses (structured view)
- Roman Catholicism in Estonia

== Sources and external links ==
- GCatholic
