= Battle of Karuse =

1270 Livonian Crusade battle

- Part of the Livonian Crusade
- Map of Livonia in 1260
Date	16 February 1270
Location	Moon Sound, frozen Baltic Sea 58.55°N 23.45°E
Result	Lithuanian and Semigalian victory

Belligerents
Grand Duchy of Lithuania; Semigallians	Livonian Order; Bishopric of Dorpat; Bishopric of Ösel–Wiek; Danish Estonia

Commanders and leaders
Traidenis	Otto von Lutterberg †; Friedrich von Haseldorf; Hermann of Buxhoeveden; Siverith

Casualties and losses
1,600 killed	52 knights and 600 low-rank soldiers

The Battle of Karuse or Battle on the Ice was fought on 16 February 1270 between the Grand Duchy of Lithuania and the Livonian Order on the frozen Baltic Sea between the island of Muhu and the mainland. The Lithuanians achieved a decisive victory. The battle, named after the village of Karuse, was the fifth-largest defeat of the Livonian or Teutonic Orders in the 13th century. Almost all that is known about the battle comes from the Livonian Rhymed Chronicle, which devoted 192 lines to the battle.

== Background ==
The Livonian Brothers of the Sword, a crusading military order established in 1202, set out to conquer and convert to Christianity indigenous peoples of present-day Latvia and Estonia. They subjugated the Semigallians by 1250. However, after the Livonian defeats in the 1259 Battle of Skuodas and the 1260 Battle of Durbe, the Semigallians rebelled. Traidenis, who became Grand Duke of Lithuania in 1269 or 1270, supported the rebellion.

In winter 1270, the Livonian Order invaded Semigalia. However, after learning that a large Lithuanian army had also invaded the region, Master Otto von Lutterberg decided to retreat to Riga. The Lithuanians marched north, reaching as far as the island of Saaremaa, which they were able to reach because the Baltic Sea was frozen. The Lithuanian army plundered the area, taking much war loot. It is unclear whether Semigallians joined the Lithuanians and participated in this campaign – contemporary sources do not mention them, but later sources such as Jüngere Hochmeisterchronik and Dionysius Fabricius always mention their participation.

Master Lutterberg gathered a large army of Livonian knights, soldiers from the Bishopric of Dorpat, the Bishopric of Ösel–Wiek, Danish Estonia, as well as local tribes of Livs and Latgalians. The Order was well-prepared for the battle: for a year it had been recruiting soldiers for an expedition into Semigalia. The Livonian army marched north to meet the Lithuanians near Saaremaa Island. The armies met on the frozen Moon Sound (probably near Virtsu) on the feast day of Juliana of Nicomedia.

== Battle ==
The Livonian army positioned for the battle: troops from Danish Estonia, commanded by the Danish king's viceroy Siverith, formed the right flank; Livonian knights, commanded by Master Luttenberg, formed the center; soldiers from the Bishoprics formed the left flank. The Lithuanians arranged their sleighs as a barricade. A vanguard unit likely covered construction of the improvised barricade so that the knights could not see it. When the knights attacked, Lithuanians retreated behind their sleighs and the Livonian cavalry ran into the barricade. As the horses got stuck between the sleighs, the horses and their riders were struck by Lithuanian spears. A small number of Livonian knights managed to break through the barricade and the left and right flanks joined the fighting, but that was not enough to overcome the strong Lithuanian formation. The Lithuanians achieved a decisive victory: 52 knights, including Master Lutterberg, and some 600 low-ranking soldiers were killed while bishop Hermann of Ösel-Wiek was gravely injured and barely managed to escape. According to the Livonian Rhymed Chronicle, 1600 Lithuanians were killed, but that information is very doubtful and most likely inflated by pro-Livonian bias.

== Aftermath ==
Vice-Master Andreas von Westfalen, who acted as a Master before proper elections could be held, decided to restore the lost morale of the knights by winning a quick victory. In the middle of 1270 he learned of another Lithuanian raid into Livonia and hurried his soldiers to seek out the enemy. While the knights were resting, the Lithuanians attacked their camp and killed Andreas and twenty more knights. This is sometimes known as the Battle of Pārdaugava near Riga, and was the tenth-largest defeat of the Teutonic Knights in its own right. Traidenis scored another victory in 1279 during the Battle of Aizkraukle.
