= Roman Catholic Diocese of Tallinn =

Diocese based in Estonia

Coordinates: 59.4381°N 24.7489°E

Diocese of Tallinn

Catholic
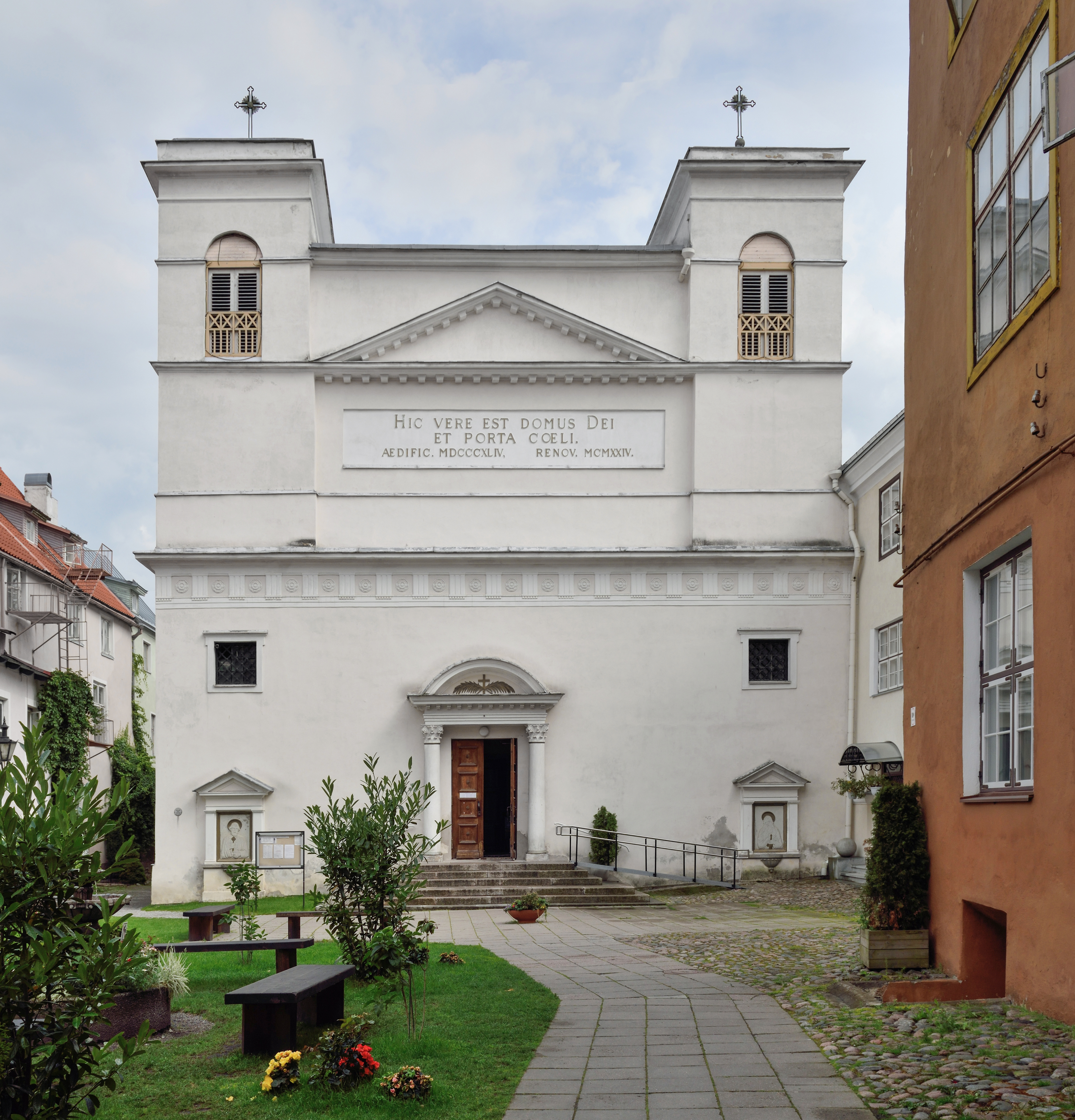
- Cathedral of Tallinn

Location
- Country: Estonia
- Metropolitan: Immediately subject to the Holy See

Statistics
- Area: 45,213 km^{2} (17,457 sq mi)
- Population: Total; Catholics: (as of 2015); 1,300,000; 6,500 (0.5%)

Information
- Denomination: Catholic Church
- Sui iuris church: Latin Church
- Rite: Roman Rite
- Established: 26 September 2024
- Cathedral: St. Peter and St. Paul's Cathedral, Tallinn

Current leadership
- Pope: Leo XIV
- Bishop: Philippe Jourdan

Website
- https://www.katoliku.ee/index.php/en/

The Diocese of Tallinn is a Latin Church diocese that covers the entire country of Estonia.

It was an apostolic administration (quasi-diocesan jurisdiction) of the Latin Catholic Church in Estonia from its formation in 1924 to 2024. Its cathedral episcopal see, the St. Peter and St. Paul's Cathedral, is located in Tallinn.

The post of apostolic administrator was often held by titular archbishops who also held posts in the diplomatic service of the Holy See as nuncio to Estonia, Latvia, and Lithuania.

== History ==
An ancient diocese with the see in Reval (Reval was the name of Tallinn until 1918) existed between 1219 and 1557.

Between 1782 and 1918 Estonia was part of the Roman Catholic Archdiocese of Mohilev and in 1786 the Roman Catholic community was officially recognized.

In 1918, when Estonia gained independence from Russia, its citizens had complete freedom of religion. The Holy See recognized Estonia on 10 October 1921. The Apostolic Administration of Estonia was established on November 1, 1924, on territory split off from the Roman Catholic Archdiocese of Riga (in the neighboring Baltic country Latvia).

The see remained vacant during most of the period when Estonia was occupied and annexed into the USSR after the death of Bishop Eduard Profittlich in 1942 because of the suppression of the Church by Soviet communist authorities.

Since 1992, after Estonia's post-communist independence, apostolic administrators are once again appointed. Pope John Paul II visited in September 1993.

On 26 September 2024, the Apostolic Administration of Estonia was raised to the Diocese of Tallinn.

== Leadership ==
Apostolic Administrators of Estonia

- Antonino Zecchini, Jesuits (S.J.), Titular Archbishop of Myra (1924.11.01 – 1931.05.11), Apostolic Delegate to Lithuania (1922.10.25 – 1927), Apostolic Internuncio to Latvia (1926.04.14 – 1935.03.07), Apostolic Delegate to Estonia (1927 – 1932)
- Eduard Profittlich, S.J. (1931.05.11 – 1942.02.22)
- vacancy in Soviet era
- Justo Mullor García (1992.04.15 – 1997.04.02), Titular Archbishop of Emerita Augusta (1979.03.21 – 1994.07.28), Titular Archbishop of Bolsena (1994.07.28 – ...), Apostolic Nuncio to Estonia (1991.11.30 – 1997.04.02), to Latvia (1991.11.30 – 1997.04.02) and to Lithuania (1991.11.30 – 1997.04.02)
- Erwin Josef Ender (1997.08.09 – 2001.05.19), Titular Archbishop of Germania in Numidia (1990.03.15 – ...), Apostolic Nuncio to Estonia (1997.07.09 – 2001.05.19), to Latvia (1997.07.09 – 2001.05.19) and to Lithuania (1997.07.09 – 2001.05.19)
- Peter Stephan Zurbriggen (2001.11.15 – 2005.03.23), Titular Archbishop of Glastonbury (1993.11.13 – ...), Apostolic Nuncio to Estonia (2001.10.25 – 2009.01.14), to Latvia (2001.10.25 – 2009.01.14) and to Lithuania (2001.10.25 – 2009.01.14)
- Philippe Jourdan (2005.04.01 – 2024.09.26), Titular Bishop of Pertusa (2005.04.01 – 2024.09.26)

Bishops of Tallinn

- Philippe Jourdan (2024.09.26 – ...)

== See also ==
- Immaculate Conception Church, Tartu
- Roman Catholic Diocese of Reval
- Catholic Church in Estonia
