= Immaculate Conception Church, Tartu =

Church building in Tartu, Estonia

Coordinates: 58.3826°N 26.7100°E

Immaculate Conception Church
- The Parish Church of the Immaculate Conception
- Pühima Neitsi Maarja Pärispatuta Saamise kirik
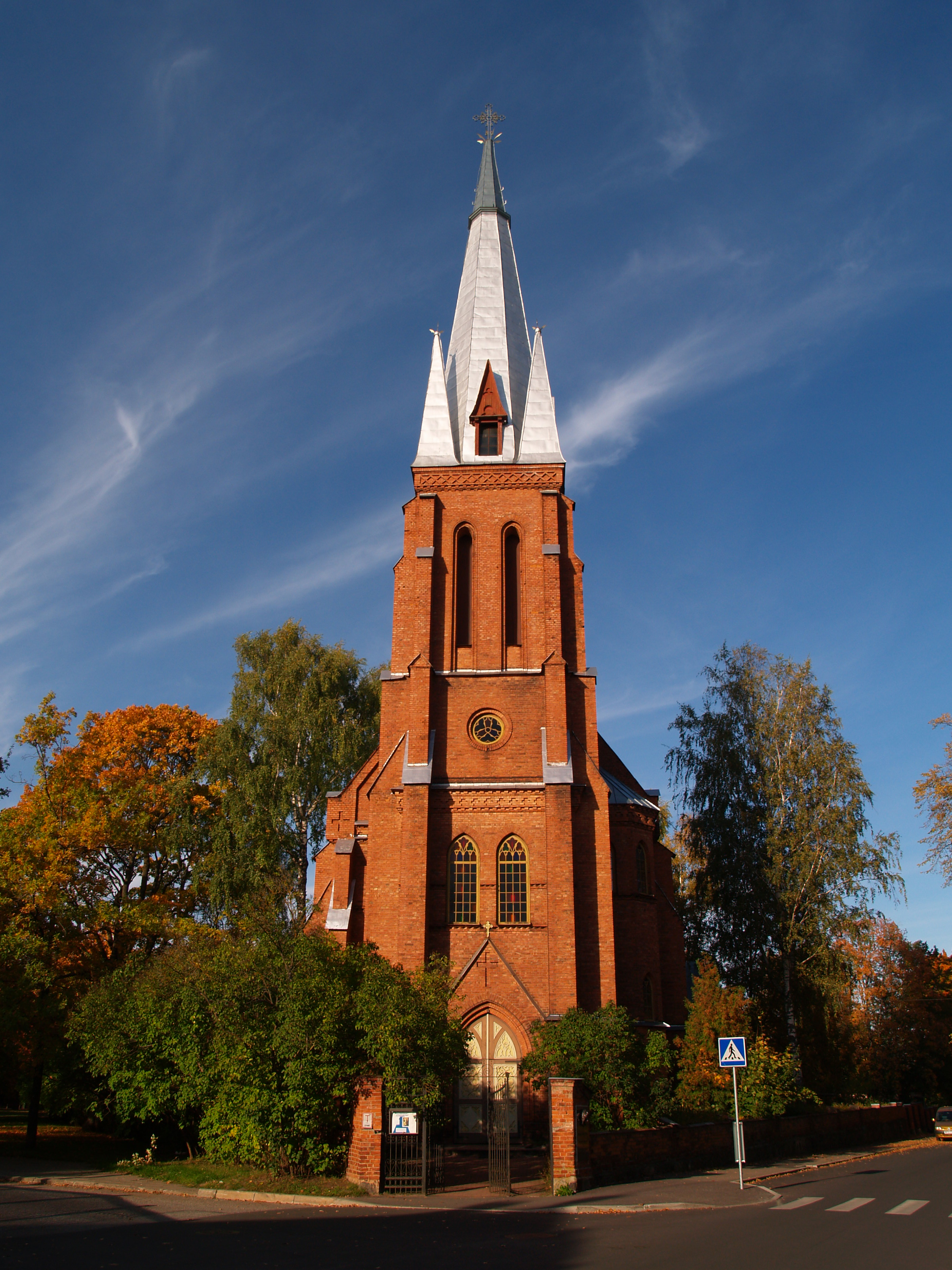
- Immaculate Conception Church
- Location: Tartu
- Country: Estonia
- Denomination: Roman Catholic

History
- Status: Parish church
- Dedication: Immaculate Conception
- Consecrated: 1899

Architecture
- Functional status: Active
- Architectural type: Church
- Style: Neo-gothic
- Years built: 1895-1899
- Groundbreaking: 1862
- Completed: 1899

Clergy
- Bishop: Philippe Jourdan
- Rector: Miguel Angel Arata Rosenthal

The Immaculate Conception Church (Estonian: Pühima Neitsi Maarja Pärispatuta Saamise kirik) also known as the Catholic church in Tartu and more formally "Church of the Immaculate Conception of the Blessed Virgin Mary" is the name given to a religious building belonging to the Catholic Church, located in the city of Tartu, the second largest in Estonia.

== History ==
It is a structure built between 1895 and 1899. It is the only Catholic parish church in Tartu. The first stone church was laid in 1862 and was officially consecrated in 1899.

It was designed by Wilhelm Schilling and built in the neo-Gothic style. It is situated in the Veski, Jakobi, Oru and Karl August Hermann streets. Because of the diverse nationalities that make up the congregation offers not only Masses in Estonian, but also in Polish and English.

== See also ==
- Roman Catholicism in Estonia
- Immaculate Conception Church (disambiguation)
