= Dormition Cathedral, Tartu =

Church building in Tartu, Estonia

Dormition Cathedral
- The Cathedral of the Dormition of Our Lady
- Jumalaema Uinumise katedraalkirik
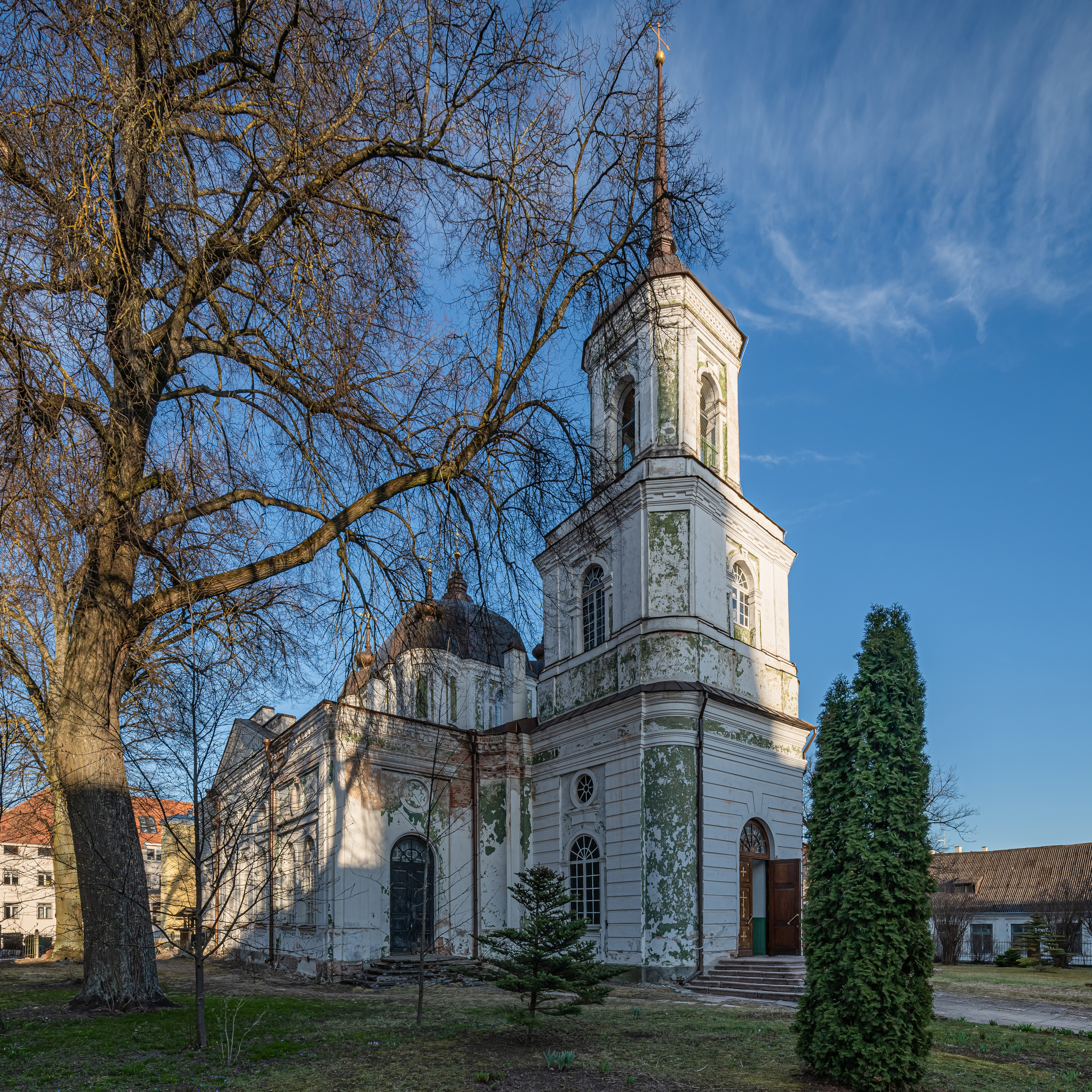
- Dormition Cathedral
- 58.382660°N 26.722335°E
- Location: Tartu
- Country: Estonia
- Denomination: Estonian Apostolic Orthodox Church
- Website: Website of the church

History
- Status: Cathedral
- Dedication: Dormition of the Mother of God
- Consecrated: 1783

Architecture
- Functional status: Active
- Architect: Paul Spekle
- Style: Russian Baroque
- Years built: 1776-1782
- Completed: 1782

Administration
- Diocese: Tartu

Clergy
- Bishop: Elijah (Ott Ojaperv)
- Priest: Vladimir Mykhalskyy

Dormition Cathedral, formally known as The Cathedral of the Dormition of Our Lady or simply Uspenski Cathedral (Estonian: Jumalaema Uinumise katedraalkirik) is a cathedral church of the Estonian Apostolic Orthodox Church in Tartu, Estonia.

== Previous churches ==
A number of other churches stood on the site of the current cathedral. A 13th century Dominican convent dedicated to St Mary Magdalene was located on the site of the present church. In 1704 a wooden church in honour of the Virgin Mary was built instead. On 16 April 1752 the cornerstone of a new stone church was laid by orders of Peter the Great. It was built on designs made by Nikolai Vasilyev. it was finished and consecrated on 28 January 1754. However, by 1762 the church became unsafe and in 1771 a church was built close by until renovations were made. In 1772, the bell tower was built. On 25 June 1775 both churches were destroyed by fire.

== Present church ==
A new church was designed by Paul Spekle which was built between 1776 and 1782. It was consecrated in 1783. The church building was built in a cruciform plan however in 1840 the church was given an octagonal base and a large domed roof and four smaller corner towers adjacent to the centre of the arches. All the details of the building are characteristic of the early style of Russian Baroque. The church became a cathedral on 10 January 2009 and serves as the seat of the Orthodox Bishop of Tartu.

== Gallery ==
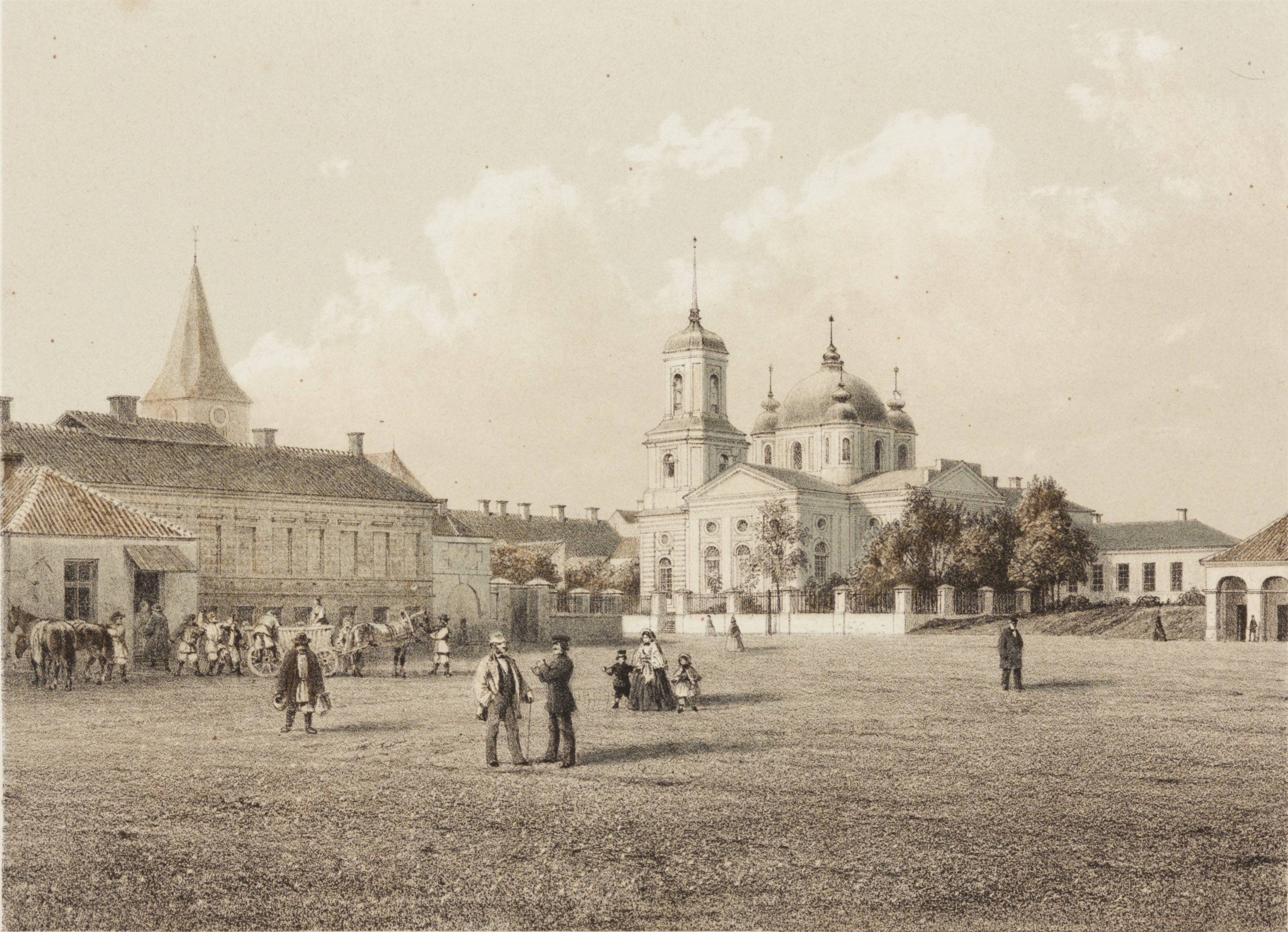
The church in 1860

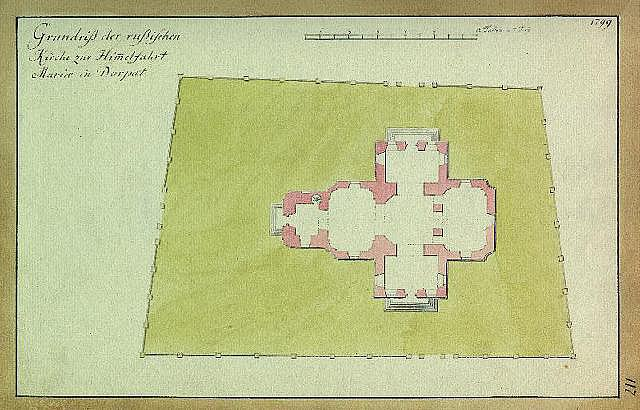
Church plan

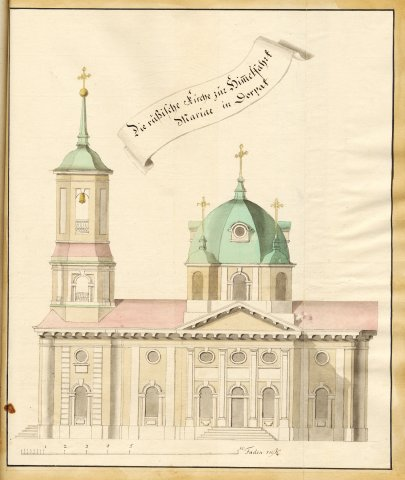

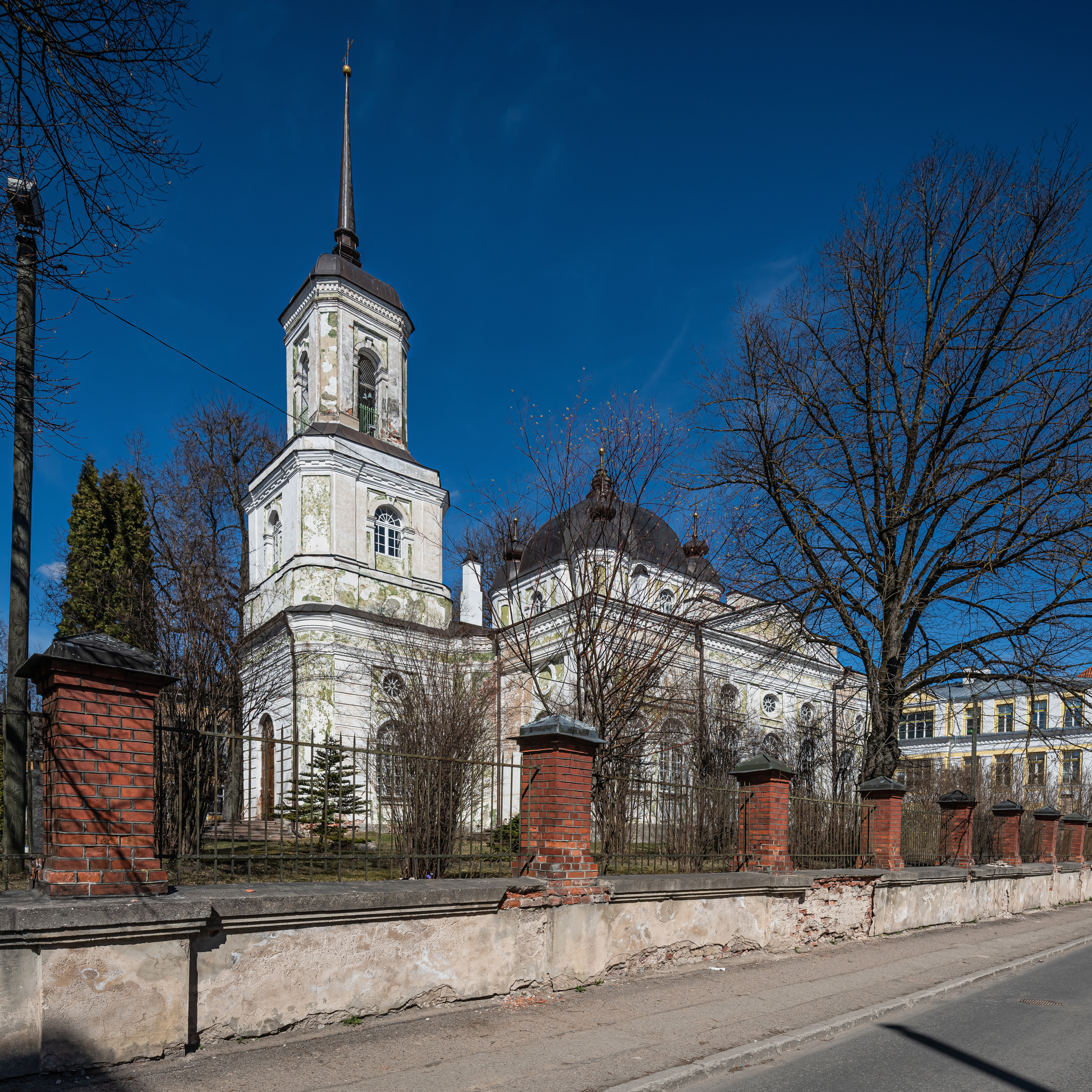
View from the street

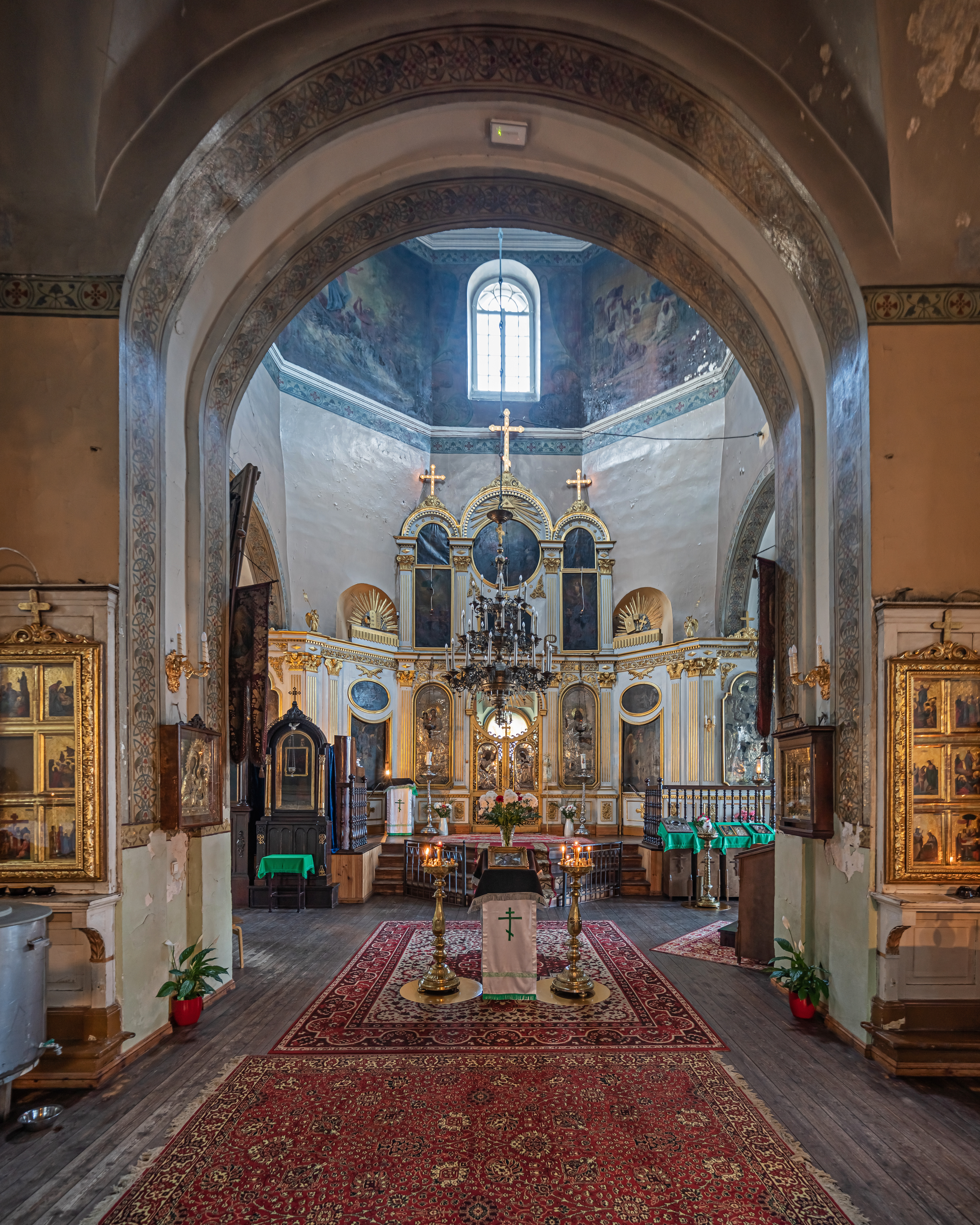
Interior of the cathedral

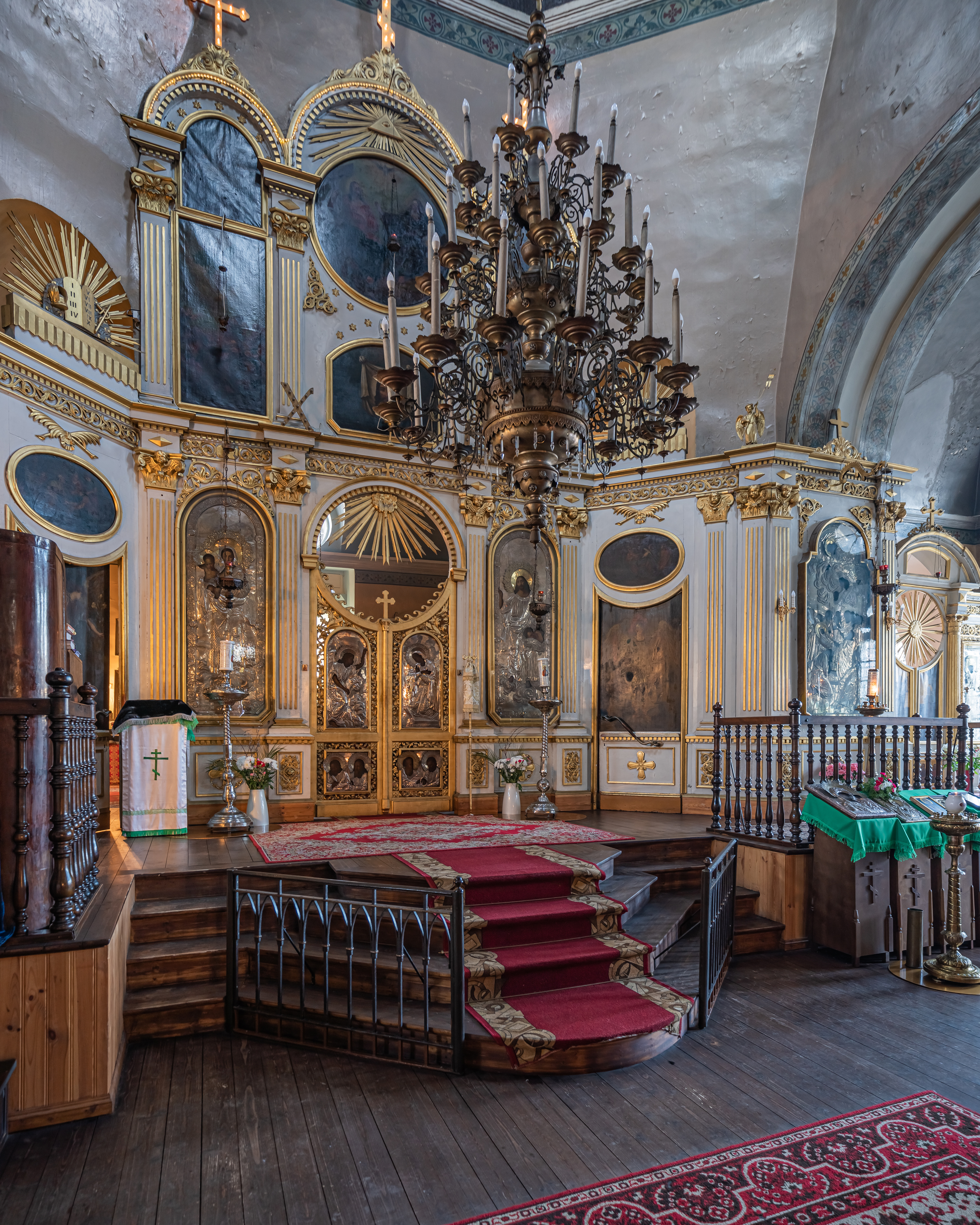
Iconostasis

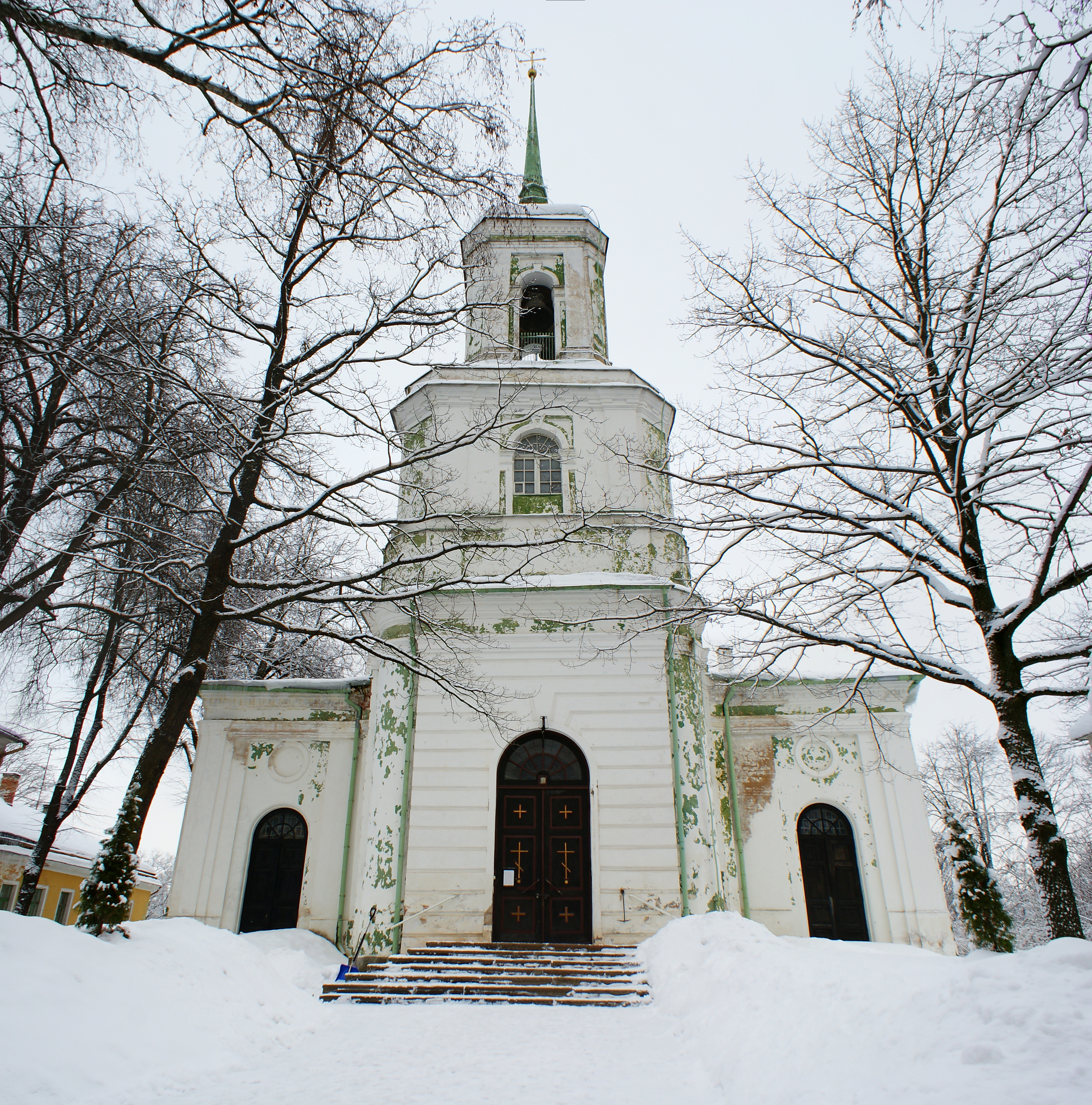
Church tower

== See also ==
- List of cathedrals in Estonia
