= Eduard Profittlich =

German Catholic archbishop (1890–1942)

Blessed Eduard Gottlieb Profittlich SJ
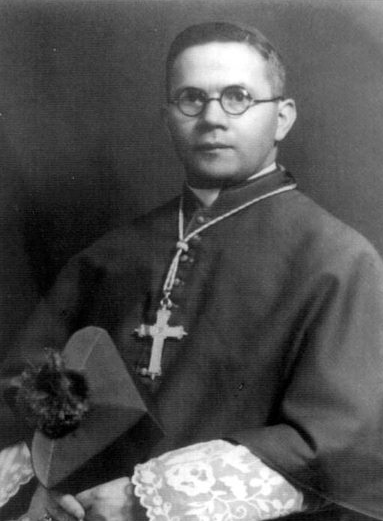
- Church: Roman Catholic Church
- Appointed: 27 November 1936
- Term ended: 22 February 1942

Orders
- Ordination: 27 August 1922
- Consecration: 27 December 1936 by Antonino Arata

Personal details
- Born: 11 September 1890 Birresdorf, German Empire
- Died: 22 February 1942 (aged 51) Kirov, Soviet Union

Sainthood
- Beatified: 6 September 2025; Tallinn Freedom Square by Cardinal Christoph Schönborn

Eduard Gottlieb Profittlich, SJ (11 September 1890 – 22 February 1942) was a German Catholic prelate who served as Apostolic Administrator of Estonia from 1931 until his death in a Soviet prison in 1942. He received Estonian citizenship in 1935 and was made an archbishop in 1936. He was a member of the Jesuits.

According to the Estonian Ministry of Foreign Affairs, Profittlich's ten years in Estonia were critical to the survival of the Church during the decades of Soviet rule. His cause for canonization was opened after his death, granting him the title "Servant of God". Profittlich was beatified in 2025, having been officially recognized as a martyr.

== Biography ==
=== Early years ===
Profittlich was born on 11 September 1890 in Birresdorf in the German Empire. He was the eighth of ten children born to peasant farmers, Markus Profittlich (1845–1921) and his wife Dorothea Seiwert (1850–1913). (Note: His older brother Peter (1878–1915) died while working as a missionary priest in Brazil.) After finishing elementary school in Leimersdorf, in 1904 he was prepared by a local parish priest to continue his education in Ahrweiler. Beginning in 1909, he studied in Linz am Rhein, graduating from high school in 1912 with a secondary school certificate. He entered the seminary of Trier, but did not graduate. His parents wanted him to become a diocesan priest and take local assignments, but on 11 April 1913 he entered the Society of Jesus in 's-Heerenberg, Netherlands. (Note: The German Jesuits had settled in the Netherlands following their expulsion from Germany under Bismarck's anti-Catholic Kulturkampf.) In September 1914 he continued his studies at the scholasticate of Valkenburg aan de Geul.

During World War I, Profittlich served as a nurse in the Imperial German Army and as a surgical assistant in a hospital in Vuizven, France, from 1915 to 1918. On 4 January 1916, Profittlich was ordained a subdeacon in the Cathedral of Trier by Heinrich Döring (1859–1951), Bishop of Poona.

After the war, Profittlich resumed his studies in philosophy and theology at Maastricht and was ordained deacon at Valkenburg on 26 March 1922 by the Cardinal Archbishop of Cologne Karl Joseph Schulte (1871–1941).

=== Priest ===
On 27 August 1922, came his ordination as a priest by Lorenz Schrijnen, bishop of Roermond, and on 30 August 1922 he celebrated his first Mass in his home parish church of St. Stephen in Leimersdorf.

Profittlich was sent to study at the Pontifical Oriental Institute in Rome to prepare for working as a clandestine missionary in Russia. In 1923 he earned a doctorate in philosophy and in 1924 another in theology at the Jagiellonian University of Kraków. From September 1924 to June 1925 he was a missionary in Czechowice-Dziedzice, Poland, and from August 1925 to March 1928 in Opole, a German city with a large Polish community; from 9 March 1928 to 1930 he was parish priest in the Polish parish of Saint Ansgar in Hamburg, and after 11 December 1930 parish priest at the Cathedral of Saints Peter and Paul in Tallinn. He took his final vows as a Jesuit on 2 February 1930.

=== Apostolic administrator ===
On 11 May 1931 Profittlich was appointed Apostolic Administrator of Estonia. The Catholic Church in Estonia at the time was relatively small, poor, and dispersed. As administrator he quickly developed a pastoral plan. His sermons were particularly popular, attracting those of other Christian denominations.

Profittlich launched Estonia's first religious weekly magazine Kiriku Elu (The Life of the Church), which was read by the Estonian intelligentsia. "He was well-known among Estonian intellectuals, worked on publishing, interacted with the political elite, and was one of the authorities in independent Estonian society." The number Catholics grew steadily and new parishes were established in Narva, Pärnu, Rakvere, Petseri, Valga, and Kiviõli. On 28 September 1933, in a private audience at the Vatican, Pope Pius XI appointed him a protonotary apostolic in recognition of his services.

Profittlich was a recognized preacher. He began to address the issue of Estonian-language literature on the subject of religion. He tried to change the image of the Catholic Church as a "Polish church" and make it more open to Estonians. In 1935, he requested and received Estonian citizenship, while retaining his German citizenship.

=== Archbishop ===
The Holy See and Estonia signed a treaty in 1935 that confirmed the legal status of the apostolic administration in Estonia. On 27 November 1936, Profittlich was named titular archbishop of Adrianople and on 27 December he received his episcopal consecration at the Cathedral of Saints Peter and Paul in Tallinn from Archbishop Antonino Arata, Apostolic Nuncio to Estonia, assisted by Jāzeps Rancāns, Titular Bishop of Marcopolis, Auxiliary Bishop of Riga, and Willem Cobben, S.C.I., Titular Bishop of Amathus in Palaestina, Vicar Apostolic of Finland. Profittlich was the first Catholic bishop in Estonia since the passage of Estonian territories to Sweden in the 17th century.

Profittlich lost his Estonian citizenship when the Soviets occupied and absorbed Estonia in June 1940. Faced with a choice between using his German citizenship to return home or acceding to the Soviet demand that he take Soviet citizenship, he twice asked for papal guidance through the Secretary of State Cardinal Luigi Maglione. Even after Pope Pius told him he was free to choose his own course, he asked for papal instruction. He received the same response accompanied by advice to decide as "inspired above all by the good of the souls entrusted to him". He interpreted that language as advice for him to remain in Estonia: "the Holy Father's wish that I should stay here". However, he obtained exit visas for some Catholic priests and sisters and some Baltic Germans to leave for Germany.

=== Arrest and death ===
On 27 June 1941, a few days after the Third Reich attacked the USSR, Profittlich was arrested by eight NKVD agents and transferred to a prison in Kirov, Russia. He was repeatedly interrogated and on 14 October 1941 he was indicted on charges of carrying out anti-Soviet agitation by using the religious feelings of the masses to incite hatred for the USSR and the Communist Party. He was also accused of espionage on behalf of the Third Reich. On 17 October, he was confronted with additional evidence of anti-Soviet talks with his fellow prisoner. He always maintained his innocence.

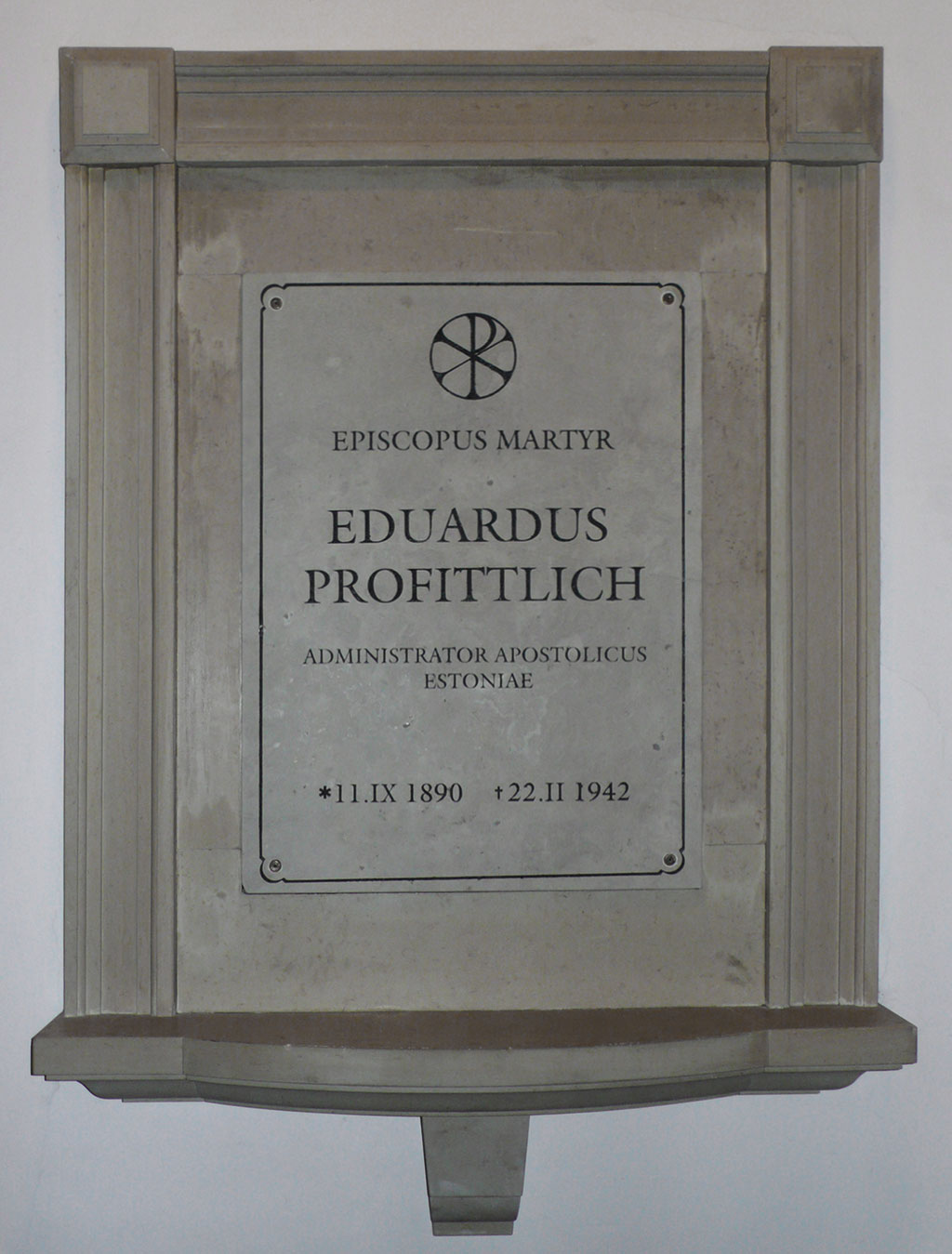
Plaque, Tallinn Cathedral

The trial began on 25 October 1941, and Profittlich was found guilty. His appeal to the Supreme Court of the USSR was rejected. He was sentenced to 5 years imprisonment and work in the labor camp in Kirov, but on 21 November of the same year he was sentenced to death by shooting for anti-Soviet activities and espionage for Germany. In Kirov on 22 February 1942 he died from exposure before the sentence was carried out.

Profittlich's death was not confirmed until the Supreme Court of Estonia informed the Catholic Church of his death on 12 June 1990, just weeks after Estonia won its independence from the Soviet Union. The court later exonerated him and other clergy posthumously. The government also granted access to archives containing documentation of his case.

On 11 September 1990, a memorial plaque dedicated to Profittlich was unveiled in Tallinn Cathedral. The cathedral has a museum displaying some of his effects.

== Beatification ==
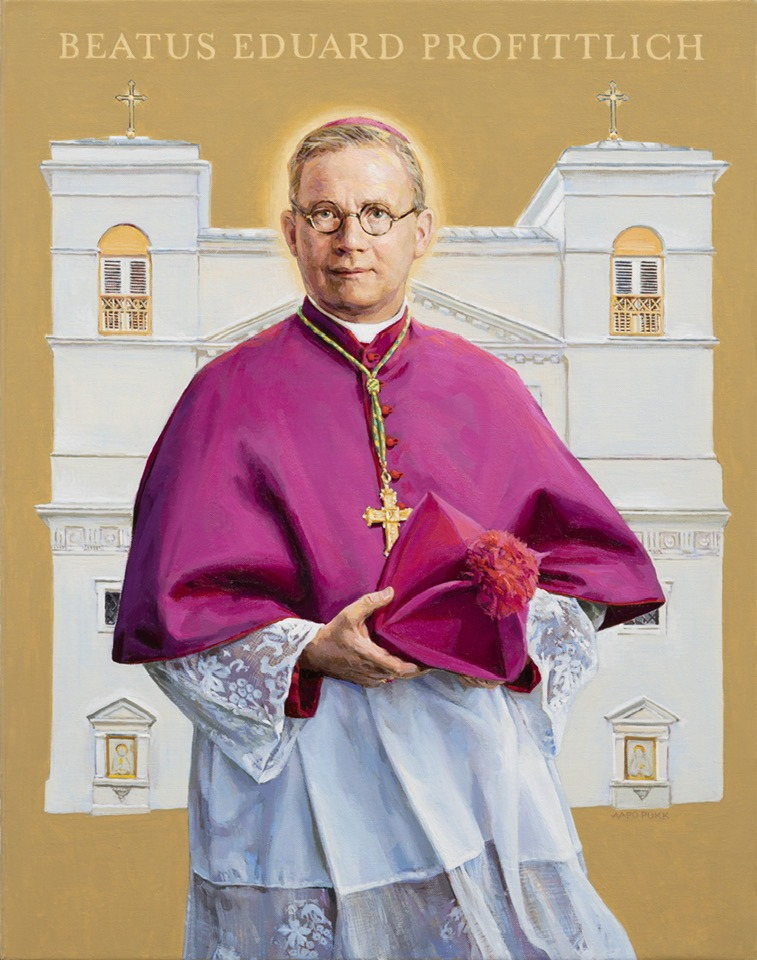
Oil painting of the Blessed Eduard Profittlich by Aapo Pukki

On 30 January 2002, the Bishops' Conference of the Russian Federation initiated the beatification process for Profittlich along with 15 others. After the Congregation for the Causes of Saints granted the nihil obstat on 30 May 2003 an ecclesiastical procedure was opened in Saint Petersburg for his beatification. In March 2019, the beatification documents reached the Congregation in Rome and were validated on 12 June 2020.

In December 2024, Pope Francis acknowledged Profittlich's martyrdom.

Eduard Profittlich's beatification took place at a solemn Mass celebrated in Tallinn's Freedom Square on 6 September 2025. The beatification was the first of its kind in the country, officially recognizing him as a martyr.

Cardinal Christoph Schönborn of Vienna presided over the beatification as the Pope's representative, while Cardinal Stanislaw Dziwisz of Krakow, Archbishop Georg Gänswein, Apostolic Nuncio to the Baltic States, Philippe Jourdan, Bishop of Tallinn, and Stephan Ackermann, Bishop of Trier, all concelebrated the Mass.
