= Otto von Lutterberg =

Teutonic knight (died 1270)

- Died: February 16, 1270; Baltic Sea near the island of Muhu
- Cause of death: killed at the Battle of Karuse

Otto von Lutterberg (died 16 February 1270) was the Landmeister of the Livonian Order of the Teutonic Knights from 1267 to 1270.

== History ==
The Battle of Rakvere took place during his command of the Livonian Order, when on February 18, 1268, the combined forces of vassals of the Danish crown, Livonian knights and local Estonian militia fought the combined forces of Novgorod and Pskov; the outcome of the battle is in dispute in the chronicles. However, according to the Livonian Rhymed Chronicle Otto von Luttenberg was not present during the battle (being at that time in Semigallia) but in June of the following year led a Livonian retaliatory expedition to the lands of Pskov, where the forces under his command burned the castle of Izborsk, the town around Pskov castle and laid siege to the castle itself. The siege ended with a truce after the defenders received reinforcements from Novgorod. Luttenberg then hastily traveled to Riga where he kidnapped and arrested the Archbishop of Riga Alfred Suerbeer, and thus solved the long-simmering power struggle with the Archbishop in favor of the Order, the bishop being released only after he promised not to appeal to the Pope or oppose the Order in the future.

Otto von Luttenberg was killed on 16 February 1270 at the Battle of Karuse against the Grand Duchy of Lithuania. He is buried in Karuse village church, in present-day Estonia.
