= St. Catherine's Monastery, Tallinn =

Monastery in Tallinn, Estonia

Coordinates: 59°26′15″N 24°44′52″E

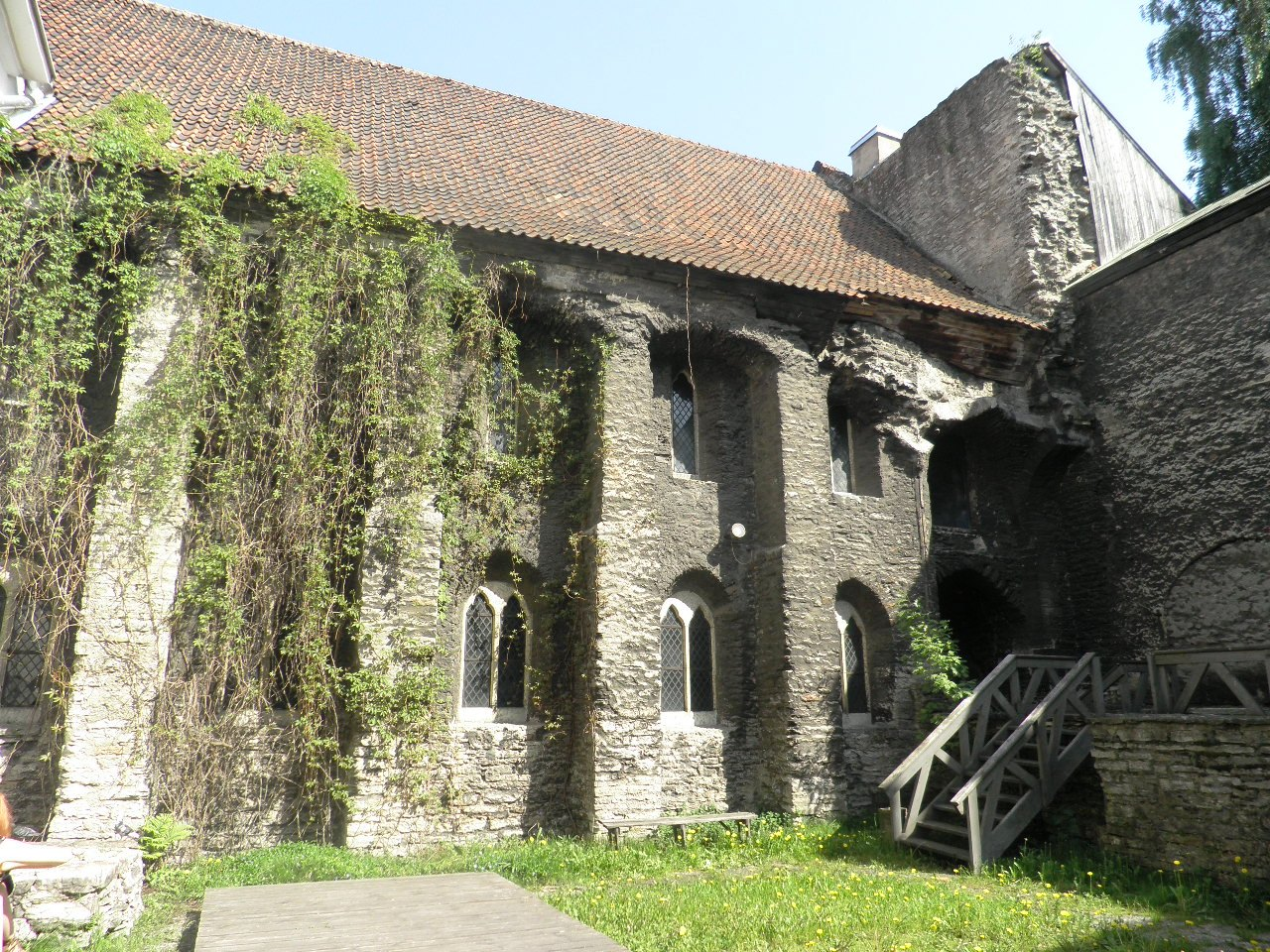
Surviving parts of St. Catherine's Dominican Monastery in Tallinn

St. Catherine's Dominican Monastery, often simply St. Catherine's Monastery or the Dominican Monastery (Estonian: Dominiiklaste klooster), is a former monastery and one of the oldest buildings in Tallinn, the capital of Estonia. It is located in the heart of Tallinn's Old Town district full of warehouses and merchants' houses. Its remains constitute one of two remaining medieval monastery complexes in Tallinn.

== History ==
A Dominican monastery is known to have existed at the site since at least 1246. The site, between present-day Vene and Müürivahe streets, was chosen carefully so as to facilitate both the friar's ability to preach to a large audience, and to suit their business interests, as they are known to have traded in fish. The monastery also had a brewery, producing four types of beer. Throughout the Middle Ages, the monastery was renowned for its scholarship.

In 1524, during the Reformation, the monastery was destroyed. Only fragments remain of the original complex. Parts have been incorporated into the Roman Catholic St. Peter and St. Paul's Cathedral, and other parts, including a finely carved portal, are visible via St. Catherine's Passage (Estonian: Katariina käik), connecting Vene and Müürivahe streets.
