= Karuse =

Village in Estonia

Coordinates: 58°37′N 23°42′E

- Village
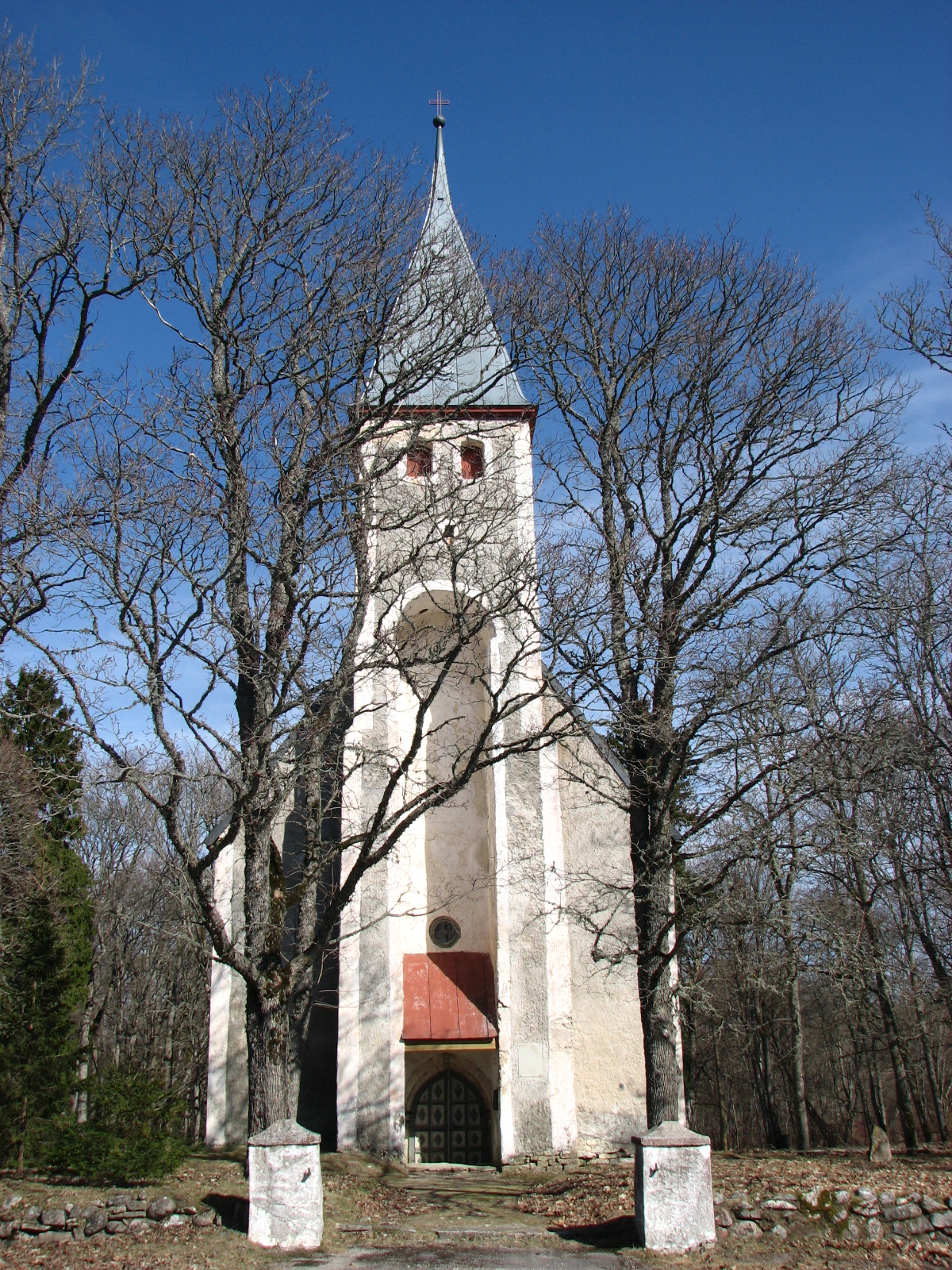
- Karuse Church
- Interactive map of Karuse
- Country: Estonia
- County: Pärnu County
- Parish: Lääneranna Parish
- Time zone: UTC+2 (EET)
  - Summer (DST): UTC+3 (EEST)

Karuse is a village in Lääneranna Parish, Pärnu County, in western Estonia. The village has twenty inhabitants (as of December 31, 2011).

Otto von Lutterberg is buried in the village church.

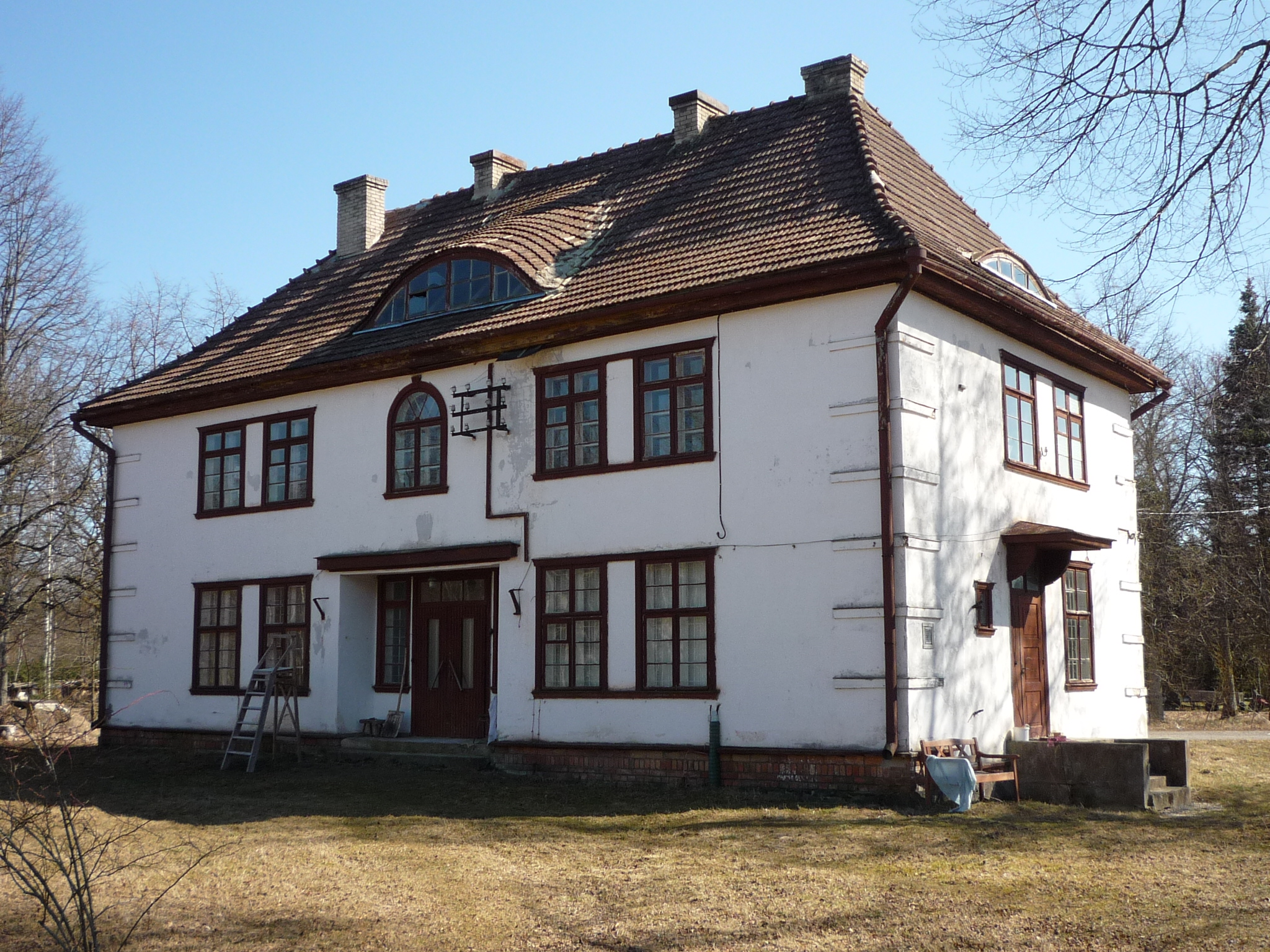
The old Karuse railway station

== See also ==
- Battle of Karuse
