= St. Peter and St. Paul's Cathedral, Tallinn =

Church building in Tallinn, Estonia

Cathedral of St. Peter and St. Paul
- Püha Peetruse ja Pauluse katedraal
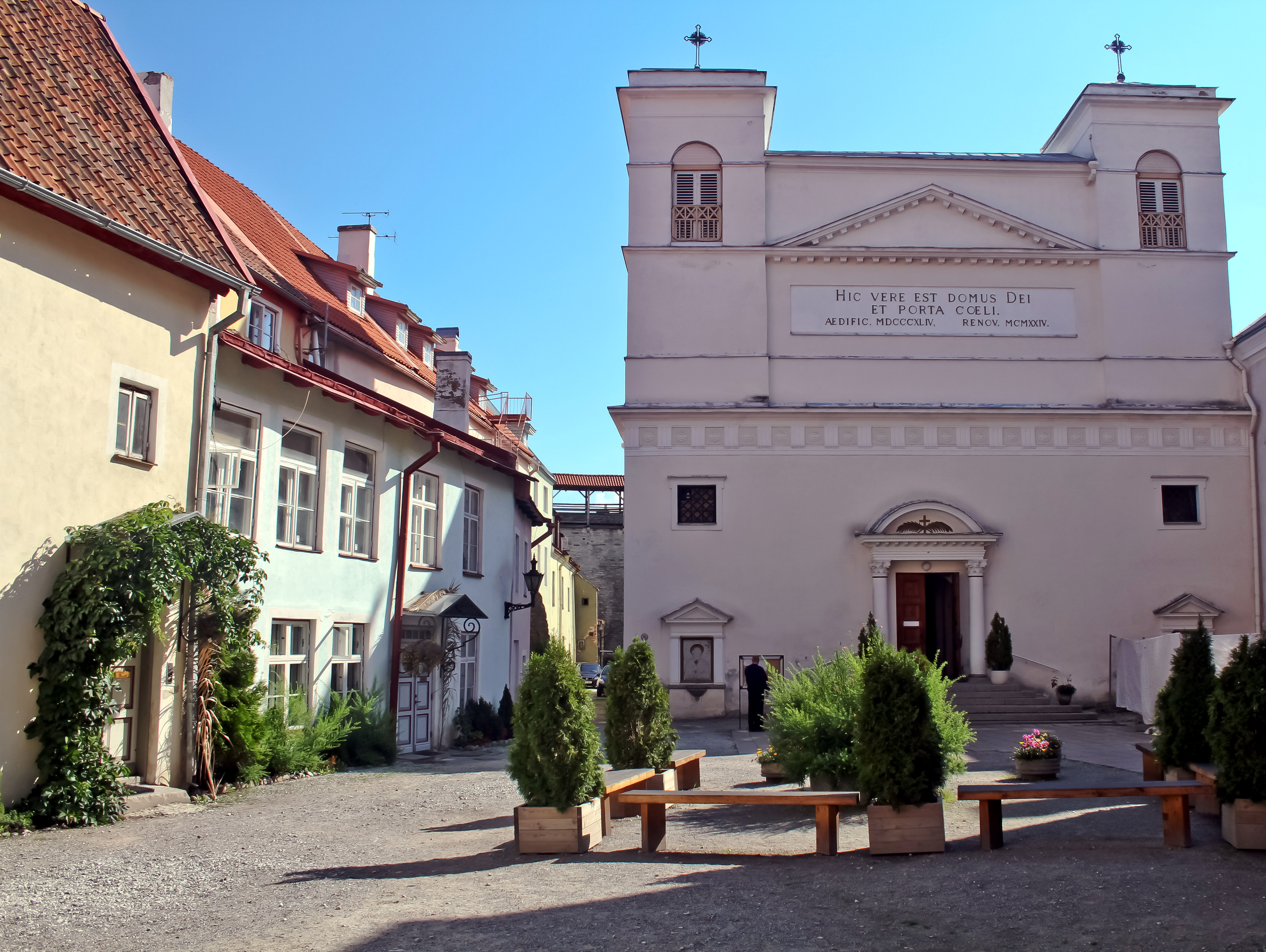
- Façade of the Cathedral
- Cathedral of St. Peter and St. Paul
- 59°26′17″N 24°44′56″E
- Location: Tallinn
- Country: Estonia
- Denomination: Roman Catholic

History
- Status: Active
- Founded: 1841
- Consecrated: 26 December 1845

Architecture
- Functional status: Cathedral and Parish church
- Architect(s): Carlo Rossi (architect), Erich Jacoby, Franz de Vries
- Architectural type: Basilica
- Style: Neo-Classical and Neo-Gothic
- Completed: 1844

Administration
- Province: Estonia
- Parish: Tallinn

Clergy
- Bishop: Philippe Jourdan
- Rector: Tomasz Materna
- Vicar(s): Alfonso Di Giovanni, Igor Gavrilchik, Ain Peetrus Leetma

St. Peter and St. Paul's Cathedral (Estonian: Peeter-Pauli katedraal) is the cathedral church of the Roman Catholic Diocese of Tallinn. It is situated on Vene street in the Old Town district of Tallinn, Estonia.

== History and architecture ==
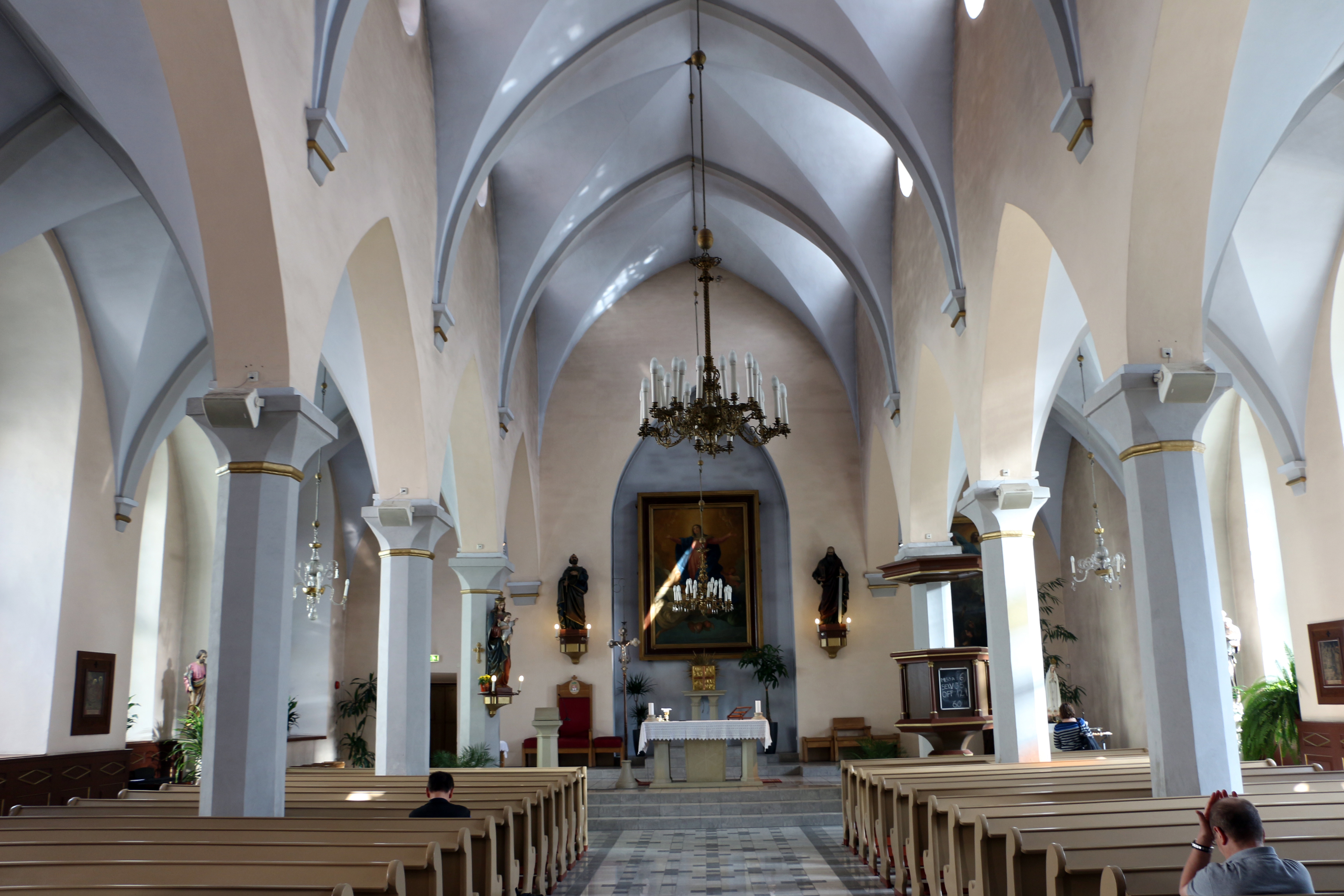
Interior

Catholicism was introduced to Estonia by force via the Northern crusades and dominated religious life during the Middle Ages. However, following the Reformation during the 16th century, Lutheranism took its place as the dominant faith, and during the time of Swedish rule in Estonia, Catholicism was banned.

Following Sweden's loss of Estonia to the Russian Empire during the Great Northern War, religious freedom was introduced by the new authorities. In 1799, the Catholic parish had grown large enough to be granted the former refectory of the long-since closed St. Catherine's Monastery as a place of worship on the site of the present church. In 1841, designs were made for a proper new church building for the site, which had grown too small. The architect was the well-known St. Petersburg architect Carlo Rossi. He designed a neo-Gothic basilica, without an apse, with a neo-classical exterior.

Between 1920 and 1924, the main, western façade received its present look, a work by architects Erich Jacoby and Franz de Vries somewhat deviating from Rossi's original façade. The interior of the church still reflects Rossi's design, however the wooden, neo-Gothic decoration has been removed. The cathedral has undergone a series of renovations, the latest in 2002–2003.

The cathedral incorporates several works of art, including works by local Baltic German artists Carl Sigismund Walther, Robert Salemann and a copy of a painting by Guido Reni.

== See also ==
- List of cathedrals in Estonia
- Catholic Church in Estonia
