= Roman Catholic Diocese of Glastonbury =

Coordinates: 51°8′44″N 2°42′52″W

Roman Catholic Diocese of Glastonbury is a former bishopric and present Latin titular (arch)bishopric in England.

== History ==
Glostonbury was the name of the-Reformation Diocese of Bath and Wells from 1197, when the Bishops of Bath annexed in vain the Benedictine Glastonbury Abbey and moved their see and title there, until the papal decision to reverse this was accepted in 1219.

== Titular see ==
In 1969, the diocese was nominally restored as a Latin titular see.

It has had the following incumbents, both of the lowest (episcopal) and intermediary (archiepiscopal) ranks :

- Titular Archbishop Thomas Joseph Toolen (1969.09.29 – 1976.12.04)
- Titular Bishop Kevin O’Connor (1979.05.28 – 1993.05.05)
- Titular Archbishop Peter Stephan Zurbriggen (1993.11.13 – ...), Apostolic Nuncio (papal ambassador) to Austria

== See also ==
- Catholic Church in England
