= Philippe Jourdan =

Catholic bishop (born 1960)

His Excellency Philippe Jourdan
- Bishop of Tallinn
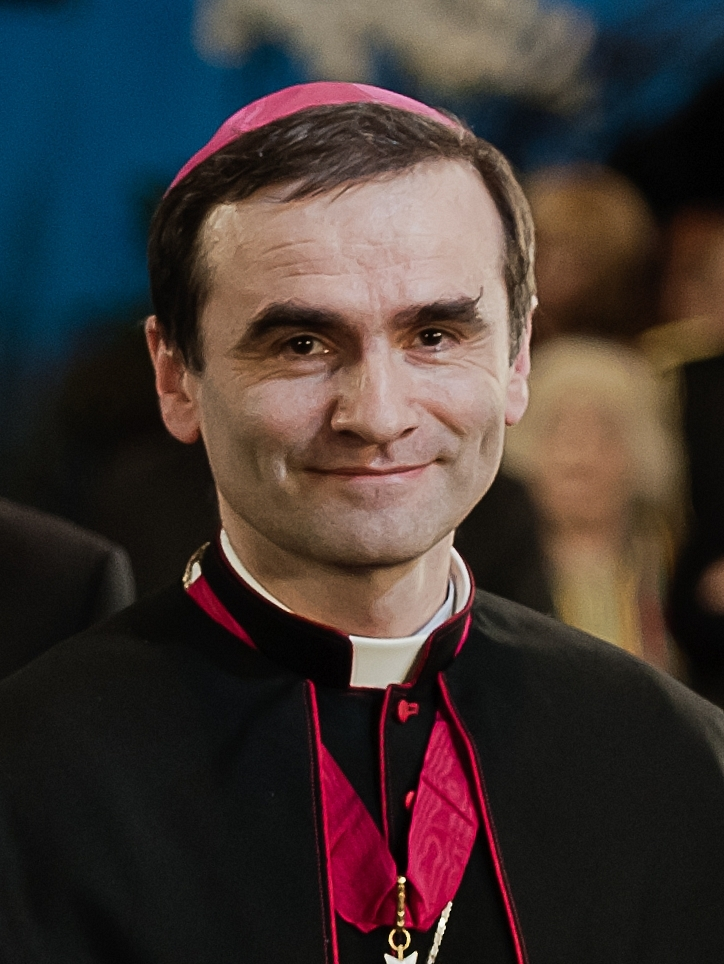
- Church: Roman Catholic
- Appointed: 26 September 2024
- Previous post: Apostolic Administrator of Estonia (2005 – 2024)

Orders
- Ordination: 20 August 1988 by Cardinal Bernard Francis Law
- Consecration: 10 September 2005 by Peter Stephan Zurbriggen
- Rank: Bishop

Personal details
- Born: Philippe Jean-Charles Jourdan; August 30, 1960 (age 65) Dax, France
- Denomination: Roman Catholic
- Coat of arms

Philippe Jean-Charles Jourdan (born 30 August 1960) is a French-born Estonian Catholic prelate who has served as the first Bishop of Tallinn since 2024, after serving as Apostolic Administrator of Estonia from 2005 to 2024. He has lived and worked in Estonia since 1996 and became an Estonian citizen in 2005.

== Biography ==
Philippe Jourdan was born in Dax, France, on 30 August 1960. His family is of Basque origin. He was the oldest of three boys; one brother is a priest. He completed his secondary education in Dax and took preparatory classes at the Lycée Louis-le-Grand in Paris. He joined Opus Dei in 1980, while studying at the École nationale des ponts et chaussées in Paris, where he completed an engineering degree in 1983. After working briefly in energy conservation and turning down a job offer from IBM, he studied for the priesthood. He obtained his doctorate in philosophy at the Pontifical University of the Holy Cross in 1987. He was ordained a priest of the Priestly Society of the Holy Cross and Opus Dei by Cardinal Bernard Francis Law on 20 August 1988.

He then practised his ministry as a chaplain at schools and student residences, first in Madrid in 1988–89, then in Paris from 1989 to 1993. He also assisted with parish duties and taught philosophy from 1989 to 1995.

In 1996, he took up an assignment in Estonia, where his knowledge of Russian and English, which are widely spoken there, made him an attractive candidate. He was appointed vicar general of the Apostolic Administration of Estonia, then the highest resident Church official in the country, as the apostolic administrator was Archbishop Justo Mullor García, who held several appointments as nuncio, including nuncio to Estonia, but lived in Lithuania. From 1999 to 2001 Jourdan served also as a parochial vicar of the Cathedral of Saints Peter and Paul in Tallinn.

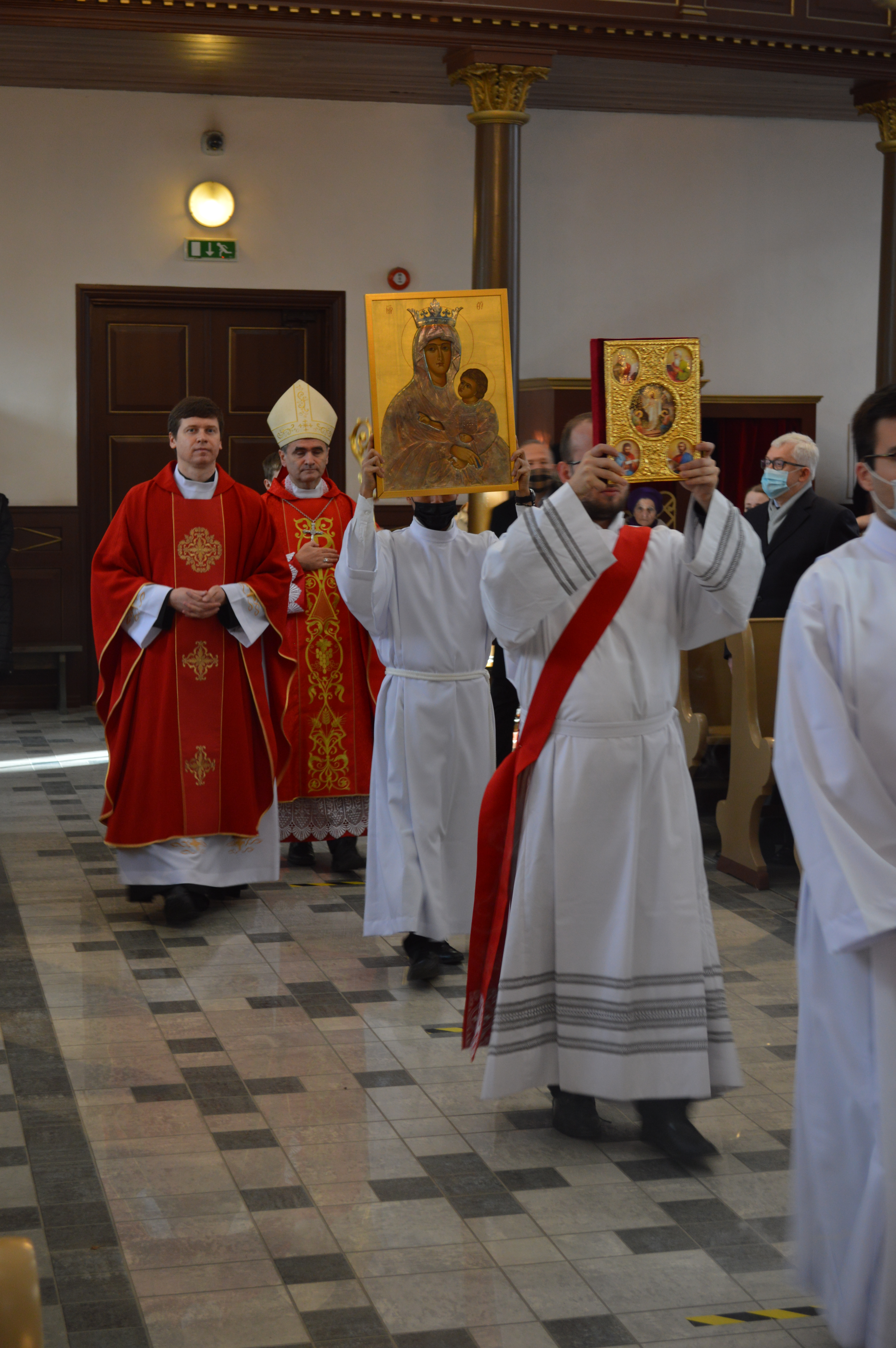
Entrance at opening Mass of the Synod on synodality in Tallinn, 17 October 2021

On 23 March 2005, (Note: Though his episcopal appointment received papal consent in March, it was announced along with more than a dozen others on 1 April, the day before the death of John Paul II.) he was appointed titular bishop of Pertusa and Apostolic Administrator of Estonia by Pope John Paul II, becoming the second Catholic bishop in Estonia since the Protestant Reformation in the 16th century. (Note: His predecessor, Eduard Profittlich S.J., died in 1942 in a Soviet prison.)

He received his episcopal consecration in Tallinn on 10 September 2005 from Archbishop Peter Stephan Zurbriggen, Apostolic Nuncio to the Baltic states. Archbishop Tadevuš Kandrusievič of Moscow and Bishop Javier Echevarría, prelate of Opus Dei, were the co-consecrators. Because the Catholic community has no church of sufficient size, the ceremony took place in the Church of St. Olaf, loaned by the local Baptist church for the occasion, and acknowledged by Jourdan as a gesture of ecumenical solidarity typical of Estonia's Christian communities.

He has been vice president of the Estonian Council of Churches since March 2004 and a bishop delegate to the Commission of the Bishops' Conferences of the European Union (COMECE) since 2010.

In 2019, when Jourdan was asked how the Church should respond to secularization, which is more advanced in Estonia than elsewhere in Europe, he said:

I don't agree with an idea present in some Church circles that due to the growing secularization living as a Christian in the society becomes virtually impossible, and Christians should retire in small communities.... A dedicated presence in the world is necessary, based on a realistic, but also hopeful vision of the society, even of a secularized society....

On 26 September 2024, he was appointed the first bishop of the Diocese of Tallinn, as the Apostolic Administration of Estonia was raised from an apostolic administration to a diocese.

He became an Estonian citizen on 22 December 2005, giving up his French citizenship. He was awarded the French Legion of Honor with the rank of chevalier on 11 July 2008.

Estonia awarded him the Order of the White Star Third Class on 22 February 2006. On 5 October 2008, the council of the Lutheran Cathedral of St. Mary in Tallinn presented Jourdan with its annual Mary Medal in recognition of his ecumenical activities and promotion of Christian values at conferences and in the press. On 2 February 2021, the Ministry of the Interior awarded him its silver medal for his work on behalf of Church-state relations and for fostering ecumenical cooperation through the Estonian Council of Churches.

== See also ==
- Catholicism in Estonia
