= Catholic Church in Estonia =

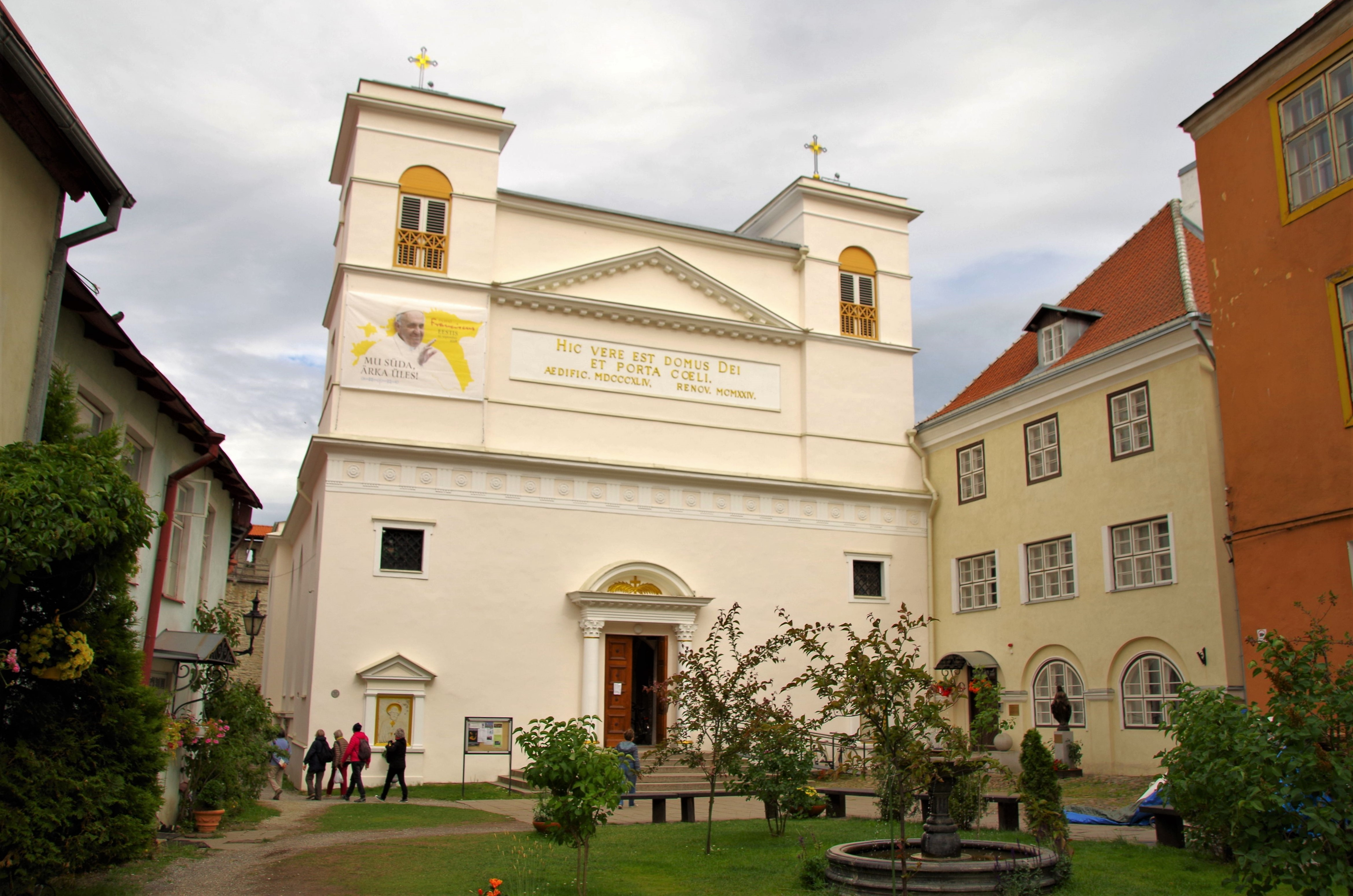
Cathedral of St. Peter and St. Paul in Tallinn

The Catholic Church in Estonia (Estonian: Katoliku kirik Eestis) is the national branch of the worldwide Catholic Church, under the spiritual leadership of the Pope in Rome.

== History of Catholicism in Estonia ==
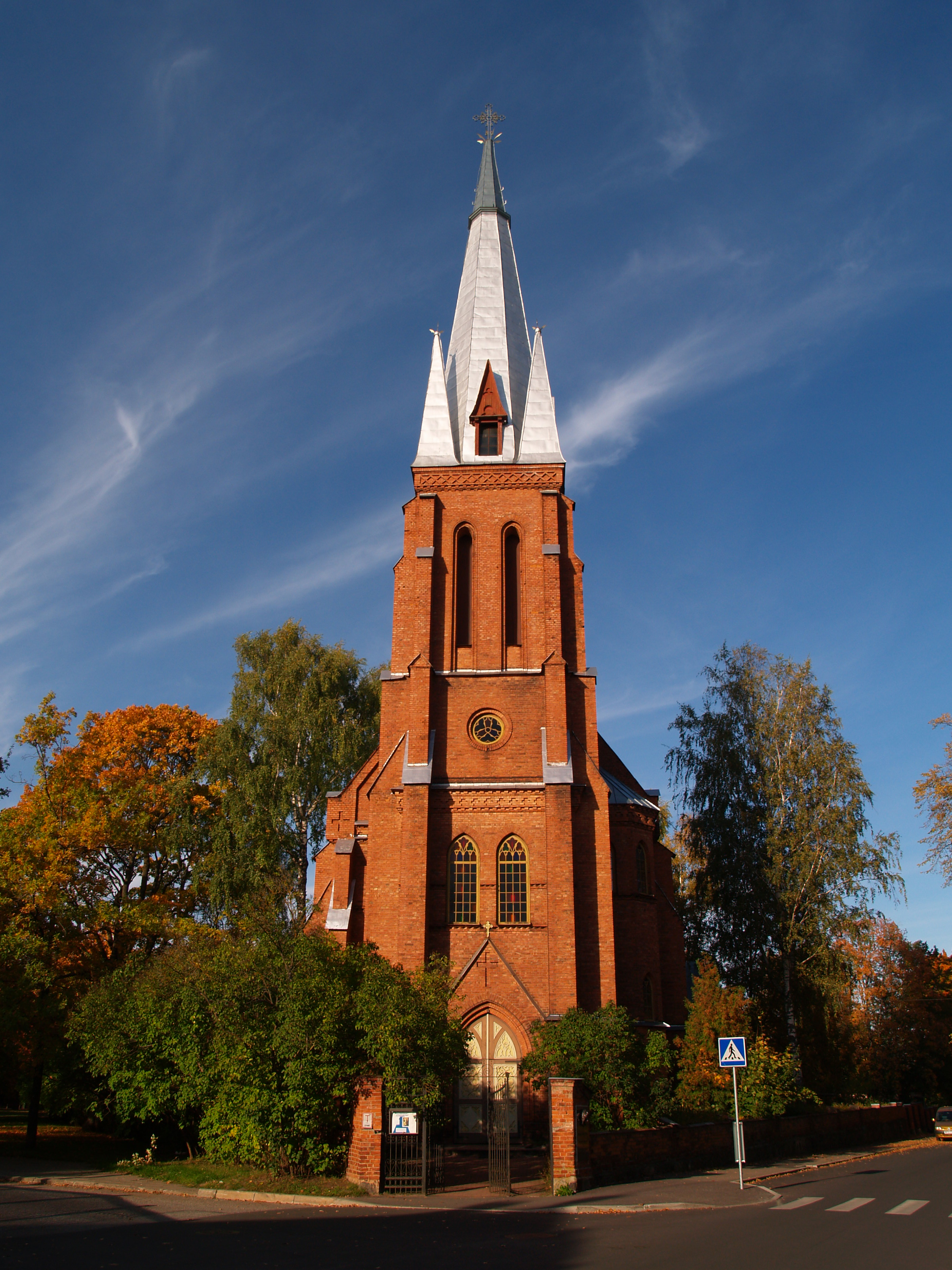
Tartu Catholic Church

At the beginning of the 13th century, Estonia was conquered by the German Teutonic Order during the Livonian Crusade and thus was one of the last territories in Europe to be Christianized. However, some archaeological evidence suggests that Christianity was already known centuries prior to the conquest. Based on archaeological relics, such as crosses and metal book corners, some areas of Estonia were Christian prior to the 13th century.

The whole of Estonia was subjugated by the year 1227 and, until the mid 16th century, Estonia was divided among feudal landlords and, thus, Catholic territory, although not yet unified.

During the Livonian War, medieval Estonia was conquered by the Swedes, initially occupying northern Estonia and, later, the southern part. Swedish rule, from 1561–1710, banned Catholicism for the benefit of the Lutheran Church.

In the Great Northern War Sweden lost Estonia to Russia, which governed the land from 1710 to 1918. Imperial Russia granted vast privileges to the resident Baltic-German nobility of Estonia, including freedom to practice their Lutheran faith. During the 18th century, Polish and then Lithuanian Catholic noblemen started to make their own use of this right. The first Catholic Mass, after more than a hundred years, was held on 18 January 1786. There were less than 300 Catholics in Estonia at that time dependent on the Roman Catholic Archdiocese of Mohilev (Estonia was part of this Archdiocese until 1918). Catholicism began its revival. On 26 December 1845, the new Catholic Church of Tallinn (now Tallinn Catholic Cathedral) was consecrated, followed by the new Catholic Church of Tartu (Immaculate Conception church) in 1899.

In 1918, when Estonia gained independence, Estonian citizens had complete freedom of religion. The Holy See recognized Estonia on 10 October 1921. In 1931 Eduard Profittlich, S.J. became the apostolic administrator for the Catholic Church in Estonia. In 1936 he was consecrated as the first Estonian Catholic bishop since the Lutheran reformation in the 16th century. Before World War II broke out, there were almost 5,000 Catholics in Estonia (Tallinn: 2.333, Tartu: 1.073, Narva: ca. 600, Valga: ca. 800).

In 1940 Estonia was invaded by the Soviets and organised religion was prohibited. The majority of the 5000 Catholic faithful either escaped the country or were imprisoned in Soviet prison camps. They arrested Bishop Profittlich who subsequently died in a Soviet prison in Siberia in 1942 after being sentenced to death as a Vatican spy. He was beatified on 6 September 2025, officially recognizing Archbishop Profittlich as a martyr. During the Soviet occupation, all Estonia's Catholic churches were closed and the Catholic population of Estonia decreased below 100 adherents and 1 underground priest who were all heavily persecuted by the KGB.

After the collapse of the Soviet Union, Estonia regained its independence and was re-recognized by the Holy See on 28 August 1991. Estonia received its first papal visit when Pope John Paul II visited the country in September 1993.

== Current state of Catholicism in Estonia ==
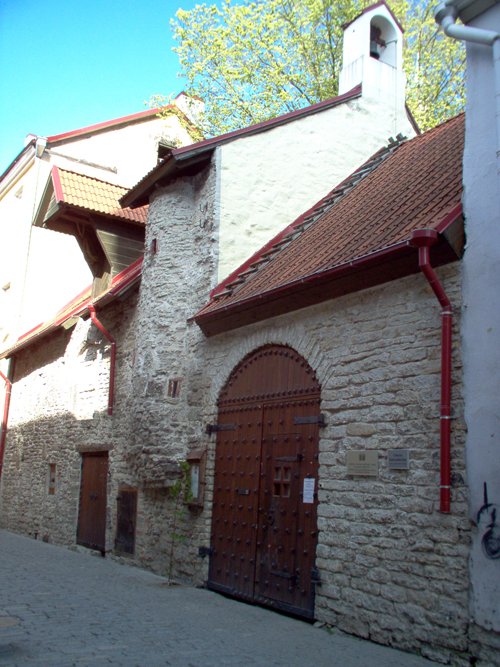
Ukrainian Greek Catholic Church, Tallinn

The Catholic population of Estonia is small, but has seen a rapid increase since the end of the Soviet rule.

In 2020, estimates suggested that there were 7,000 Catholics in the country (0.5% of the population); this included 31 priests and nuns across 10 parishes. Most are of Estonian background but also many Lithuanians and Poles. Most live in the major towns such as Tallinn, Tartu, and Narva. Estonia had no dioceses after 1560 but after 1924 the whole country formed an apostolic administration. From 2005 to 2024 the Apostolic Administrator of Estonia who resides in Tallinn was Bishop Philippe Jourdan. He then became bishop of the newly established Diocese of Tallinn, which encompasses all of Estonia. Two parishes in Estonia (Tallinn and Tartu) are of the Greek Catholic Church and serve a mostly Ukrainian congregation.

At the turn of the 20th and 21st century, brothers from Lithuania helped organize a Ukrainian Greek-Catholic parish in Tallinn.

== See also ==
- Estonia-Holy See relations
- Apostolic Administration of Estonia
- Religion in Estonia
- Eastern Orthodoxy in Estonia
