= Bishopric of Ösel–Wiek =

Semi-independent Roman Catholic prince-bishopric

Bishopric of Ösel–Wiek Bisdom Ösel–Wiek (nds) Ecclesia Osiliensis (la)
- 1228–1560
- Coat of arms

- The Bishopric of Ösel–Wiek, shown (red, upper left, across the Estonian mainland and the islands of Dagö (Hiiumaa) and Ösel (Saaremaa)) within the Livonian Confederation, 1260
- Status: Prince-Bishopric of Terra Mariana
- Capital: Leal (Lihula); Perona (Vana-Pärnu); Hapsal (Haapsalu); Arensburg (Kuressaare)
- Common languages: Low German, Estonian
- Religion: Roman Catholic
- Prince-Bishop
  - 1228–1229: Gottfried
  - 1542–1560: Johannes V von Münchhausen
- Historical era: Middle Ages
  - Established: 1 October 1228
  - Sold to Denmark: 1560
Preceded by	Succeeded by
Lääne County; Saare County	Danish Estonia; Crown of the Kingdom of Poland
- Today part of: Estonia

The Bishopric of Ösel–Wiek (Estonian: Saare-Lääne piiskopkond; German: Bistum Ösel–Wiek; Low German: Bisdom Ösel–Wiek; contemporary Latin: Ecclesia Osiliensis) was a Roman Catholic diocese and a semi-independent prince-bishopric — part of Terra Mariana (Old Livonia) in the Holy Roman Empire. The bishopric covered what are now Saare, Hiiu, Lääne counties and the western part of Pärnu county of Estonia.

== History ==
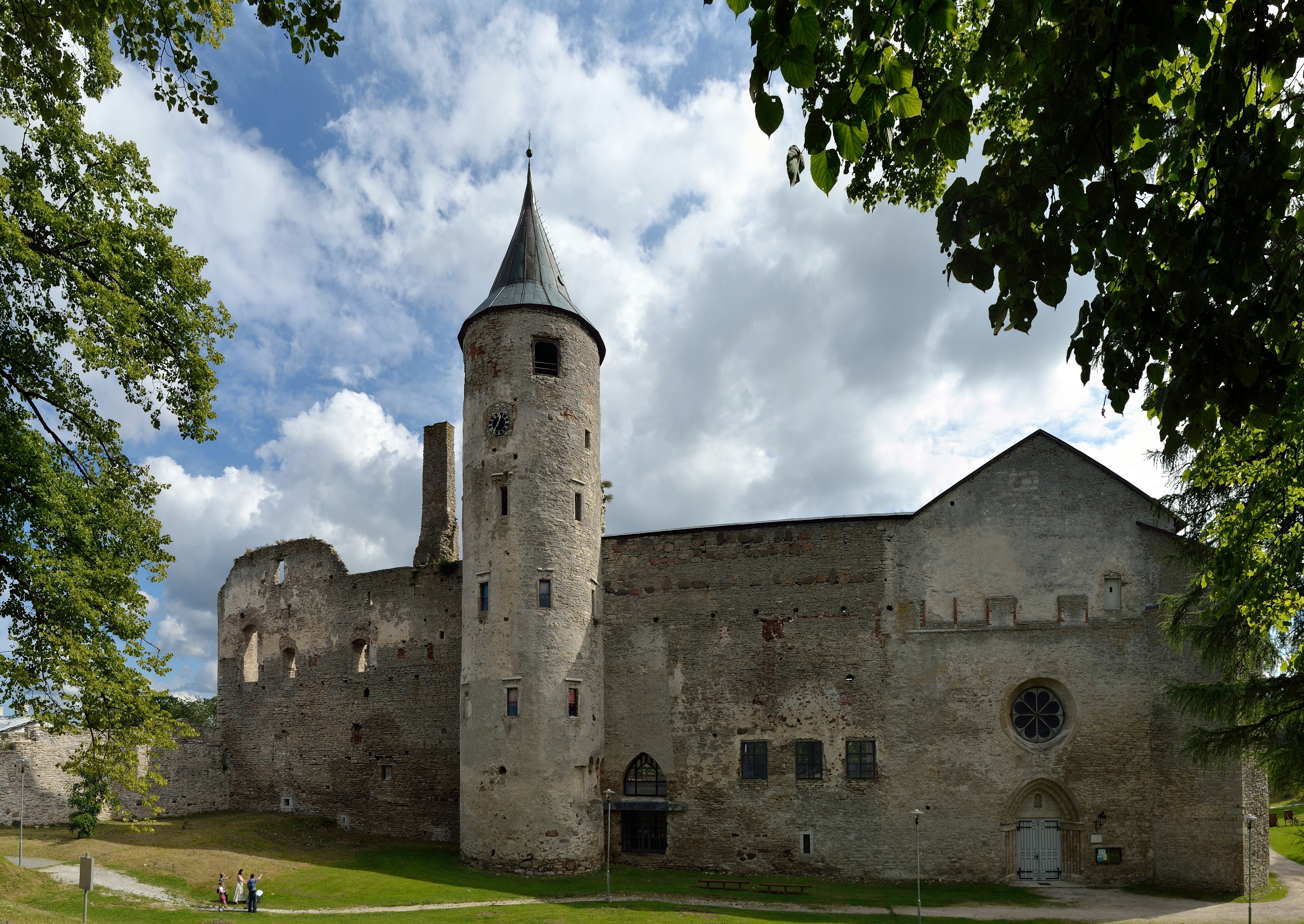
Haapsalu Episcopal Castle.

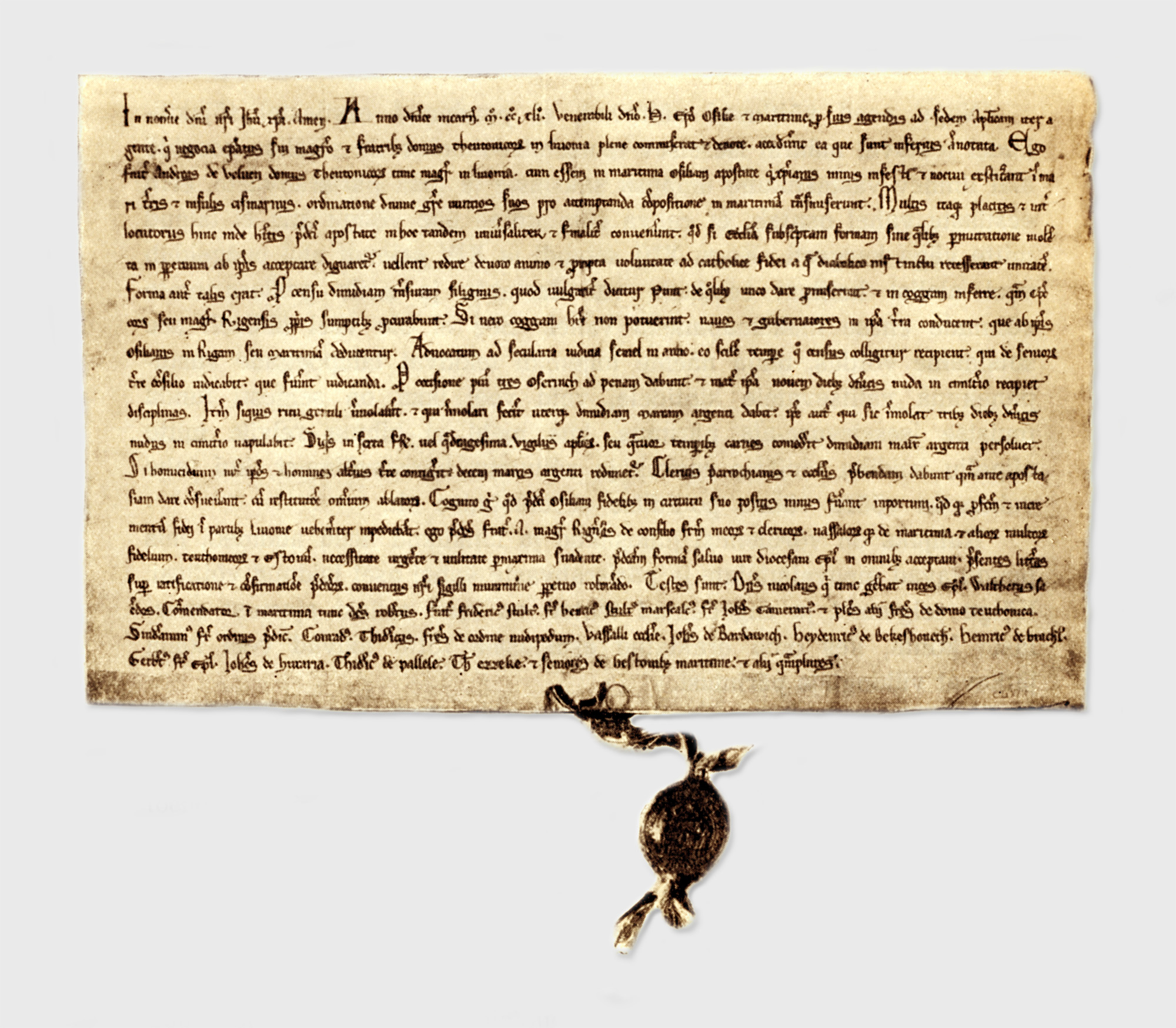
The 1241 Treaty between the Bishopric of Ösel-Wiek, the Livonian Order, and Oeselians (now at National Archives of Sweden)

The bishopric was created on 1 October 1228 as a Latin rite, and initially possibly exempt, diocese by papal legate William of Modena and simultaneously as a state of Holy Roman Empire—making it a prince-bishopric—by Henry, King of the Romans (1220-1242; not Emperor). Due to the repeated shift of the seat of the bishops, it was also successively known as bishopric of Leal (Lihula) from 1234, Perona (Vana-Pärnu) from 1251, Hapsal (Haapsalu) Castle from 1279, and the seat shifted (alone) to the castle of Arensburg (Kuressaare) on the island of Ösel (Saaremaa); the cathedral and cathedral chapter (canons) remained in Hapsal. It was a suffragan diocese in the ecclesiastical province of the Metropolitan Archbishopric of Riga from 1253.

One of the five members of the Livonian Confederation, the state was administratively divided into two bailiwicks (Latin advocaciae, German Vogteien). The bishop was also the lord of the Teutonic Order over its fiefs on the bishopric's territory. From 1241 until 1343, Ösel (Saaremaa) Island was an autonomous part of Ösel-Wiek prince-bishopric (autonomy renewed 27 August 1255).

The principality ceased to exist in 1560 when its last prince-bishop, Johannes V von Münchhausen, sold it to Denmark, which vested executive power in royally appointed Governors (styled Lensmænd to 1654, then Statthalter). King Frederick II of Denmark's brother Magnus of Livonia, Duke of Holstein, obtained it as an appanage on 15 April 1560 and was elected bishop on 13 May 1560; the Danish dynasty being Lutheran, he abolished the diocese and assumed the secular feudal style Lord of Ösel (Stieffte Ozel und Wieck Herr) on 20 March 1567.

Denmark ceded Wiek (Lääne County) to the Polish–Lithuanian Commonwealth in exchange for parts of Ösel belonging to the Livonian Order. Later Ösel became a Danish possession.

== Episcopal Ordinaries and Prince-Bishops of Ösel-Wiek (Saare-Lääne) ==
- Gottfried, Cistercian Order (O. Cist.) (1227, elected 29 June 1228; approved August 1228 – death after 1257)
- vacancy & interregnum 1229 - 1234, ruled by the Bishop of Riga and the Livonian Swordbrothers Order.
- Heinrich I, Dominican Order (O.P.) (1234 – death 1260.03.10)
- Hermann I de Becheshovede (Buxhoevden) (1262– death 1285?)
- Heinrich II (1290.05.10 – death 1294)
- Konrad I (1294? – death 1307)
- Vacancy & Interregnum
- Hartung (Garttungus) (1310 – death 1321)
- Jakob II (1322.03.03 – 1337)
- Hermann II Osenbrügge (de Osenbrygge), (1338 – death 1362?63)
- Konrad II (1363.07.24 – death 1374)
- Heinrich III (1374.10.23 – assassinated before 1381.07.05), previously Bishop of Schleswig (1370.01.30 – 1374.10.23)
- Vacancy & Interregnum
- Winrich von Kniprode (1385.03.28 – death 1419.11.05)
- Caspar Schuwenflug (1420.01.08 – death 1423.08.10)
- Christian Kuband, Norbertines (O. Praem.) (1423.08.10 – death 1432.07.21)
- Johannes I Schutte (1432.10.22 – 1438.09.12)
- Johannes II Creul (Kreuwel), Teutonic Order (O.T.) (1439.03.20 de jure – 1457 de facto since 1449 in Wiek as the younger Bishop - death 1454.09.23)
- Ludolf Grove (1457 de jure – death 1458.03.11) (de facto since 1439, since 1449 as the older Bishop in Saaremaa and Dagö)
- Jodokus Hoenstein (1458.07.24 – death 1471.01.17)
- Peter Wetberg (1471.06.17 – death before 1491.11.14)
- Johannes III Orgas (Johann Orgies) (1492.03.26 – death 1515.03.19)
- Johannes IV Kyvel (Kievel) (1515.03.19 – death 1527.04.22), succeeded as former Coadjutor Bishop of Ösel-Wiek (? – 1515.03.19)
- Georg von Tiesenhausen (1527.05.20 – death 1530.10.02), previously Bishop of Reval (Estonia) (1525.07.21 – 1530.10.12)
- Reinhold von Buxhoeveden (1532.07.03 – retired before 1541.07.13), died 1557
- Johannes V von Münchhausen (1542.01.09 – 1560 sold the see)
- Magnus of Livonia (also Prince of Denmark and Duke of Holstein), 1560–1572 (Protestant bishop, died 1583)

== See also ==
- List of Catholic dioceses in Estonia

== Sources ==
- Pius Bonifacius Gams, Series episcoporum Ecclesiae Catholicae, Leipzig 1931, p. 297
- Konrad Eubel, Hierarchia Catholica Medii Aevi, vol. 1, p. 379; vol. 2, p. 207; vol. 3, p. 264
- Ernst Friedrich Mooyer, Verzeichnisse der deutschen Bischöfe seit dem Jahr 800 nach Chr. Geb., Minden 1854, p. 75
