= Hermann of Buxhoeveden, Bishop of Ösel-Wiek =

Medieval clergyman in the Holy Roman Empire

Hermann of Buxhoeveden or Bekeshoevede (1230–1285) was a medieval clergyman. He was consecrated bishop of Ösel–Wiek on 20 August 1262 in Lübeck and remained in that post until his death. He was a member of the Buxhoeveden family, as was a later holder of the same bishopric, Reinhold von Buxhoeveden.

In 1262, he ceded the patronage of Järvenpää (Kiligund) to the Teutonic Order. On 21 August that year he confirmed the privileges of merchants in West Saare. In 1277, he, the archbishop of Riga Johannes I of Lune and the bishop of Dorpat he made a similar settlement regarding Baltic merchants active in Estonia and Livonia. On 29 March 1277 he, the Archbishop and Ernst von Ratzeburg (master of the Livonian Order) granted privileges to the merchants, allowing them freedom from coastal law, customs duties and port and pasture taxes and the right to an independent port. On 4 February 1278 he, the bishop and the archbishop allowed merchants to trade with the Russians in the Baltic.

In 1279, he founded Haapsalu Castle. In 1284, he renewed and strengthened his predecessors' diocesan statutes for tithing on the mainland and collecting tribute from re-baptized peasants.

== Sources ==
- (in German) Leonid Arbusow, "Livlands Geistlichkeit vom Ende des 12. bis ins 16. Jahrhundert".
- (in German) Friedrich Georg von Bunge, "Liv-, Esth- und Curländisches Urkundenbuch nebst Regesten".
