= Võilaid =

Island in Estonia

- Interactive map of Võilaid

Geography
- Location: Baltic Sea
- Area: 2.5 km^{2} (0.97 sq mi)

Administration
- Estonia

Demographics
- Population: 0

Võilaid is a small, uninhabited Estonian island in the Baltic Sea. Its coordinates are 58°30′56″N 23°22′12″E.

Võilaid lies southeast of the Estonian island of Muhu in the Gulf of Riga. The island covers an area of 2.5 km^{2} and is uninhabited. In the spring and summer months, the island is used for grazing livestock and horseback-riding excursions. The highest point is 3.6 m above the sea level. At low tides the water level is shallow enough to enable passage to the island of Muhu by foot.

Võilaid, along with other areas in Estonia, such as Manilaid, Kihnu, Ruhnu, Harilaid, Käina, Kassari, Saarnaki laid, Saastna, Salmi, Penijõe, Põgari-Sassi, Haeska, Kumari, Tahu, was selected by the LIFE-Nature project's "Boreal Baltic Coastal Meadow Preservation in Estonia" as having the most viable coastal meadows in the country.

The island was named after the village Võiküla on the island of Muhu. Together with Muhu and the neighbouring small lands of Kesselaid, Viirelaid and Suurlaid it forms Muhu Parish (Estonian: Muhu vald), the rural municipality within Saare County.
