= Suurlaid =

Island in Estonia

Coordinates: 58°31′42″N 23°15′39″E

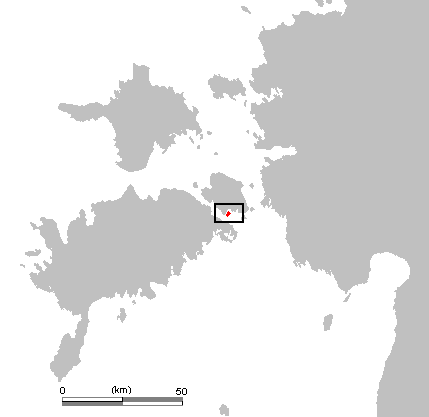
Location of Suurlaid

Suurlaid (English: Big Islet) is a small Estonian island in the Baltic Sea.

Suurlaid lies just off the southern coast of the Estonian island of Muhu. Together with Muhu and neighbouring islands Viirelaid, Võilaid, it forms Muhu Parish (Estonian: Muhu vald), a rural municipality within Saare County, Estonia. The nearest settlement is the village of Pädaste, which lies on the southern coast of Muhu. The island has a total area of 1.9 hectares (0.019 km^{2}) and is very flat. The highest elevation point on the island is only 2.1 meters (6 ft 11 in) above sea level.

The area around the island is rich in fish stocks, and the island itself is farm managed in the spring and summer with cattle and sheep.

== See also ==
- List of islands of Estonia
