= Koguva =

Village in Estonia

- Village
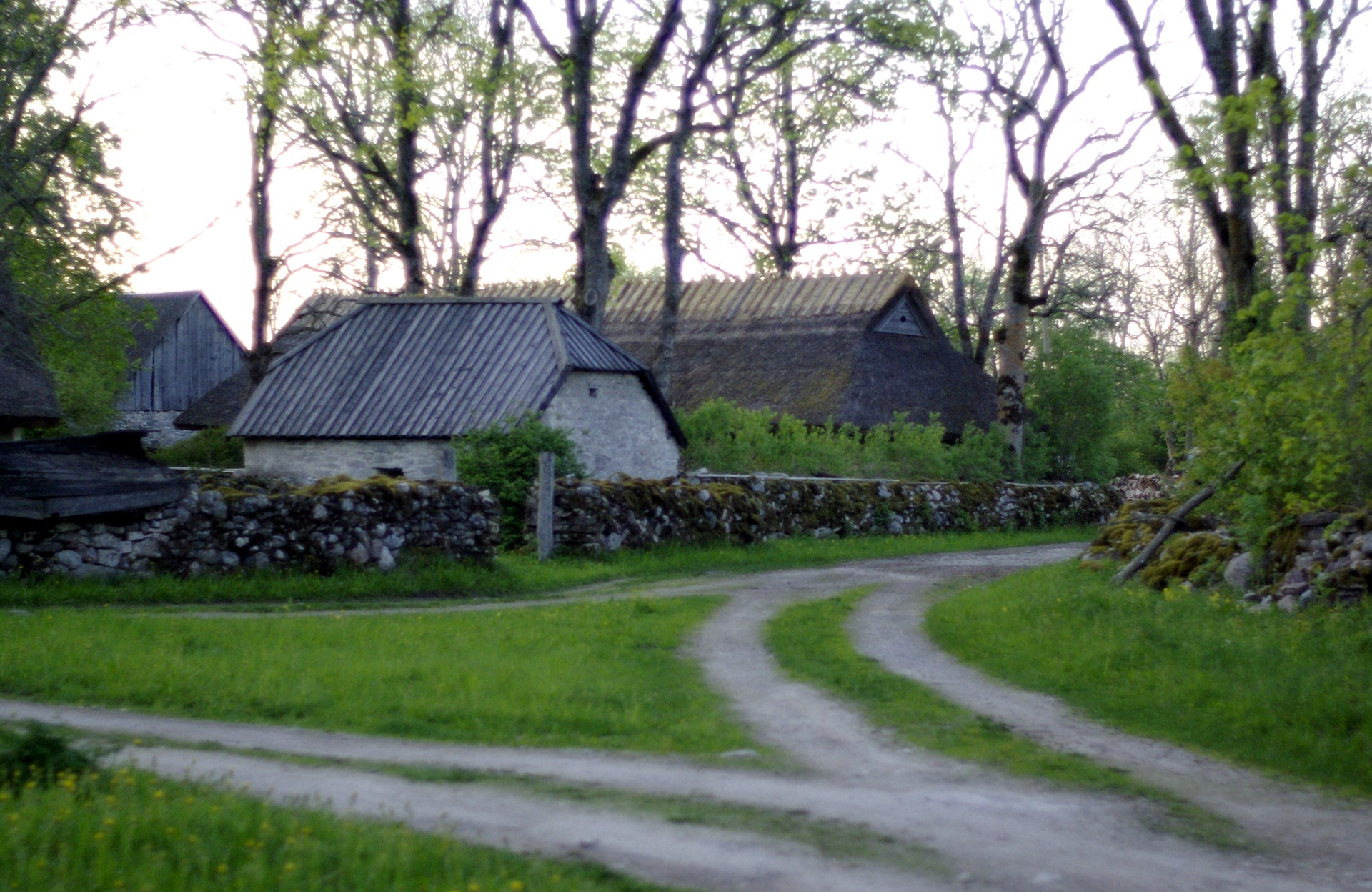
- Typical scene in Koguva

- Location in Estonia
- Coordinates: 58°35′44″N 23°04′50″E
- Country: Estonia
- County: Saare County
- Municipality: Muhu Parish
- First mentioned: 1532

Population (01.01.2000)
  - Total: 30

Koguva is a village on the Estonian Baltic Sea island of Muhu. Administratively, it belongs to Muhu Parish, Saare County. Koguva is located on the western tip of the island, and the small islet of Kõinastu is located just 2 km (1.2 mi) to the northwest in the Väinameri Sea. In 2000, Koguva had a population of 30.

Koguva was first mentioned in 1532 by Wolter von Plettenberg in a document to grant freedom to a peasant called Hansken and his son and their descendants. Later, Hansken's descendants came to be called by the surname Schmuul.

Koguva is a small rural village. There are many buildings that are centuries old, dating back to feudal times under Swedish rule, and still in use today. The northern shore of Muhu, which is claimed to have the clearest water anywhere in the Baltic Sea, is only a short distance away. Koguva has two large rural places of accommodation right next to each other and some smaller ones too.

The writer Juhan Smuul (1922–1971) was born in Koguva and owned his father's farm there until his death. He was a descendant of Hansken; his surname was initially Schmuul, but he later simplified it to Smuul. The Juhan Smuul museum was established in Koguva in the 1970s and was converted to the Muhu Museum in the 1990s.

== Gallery ==
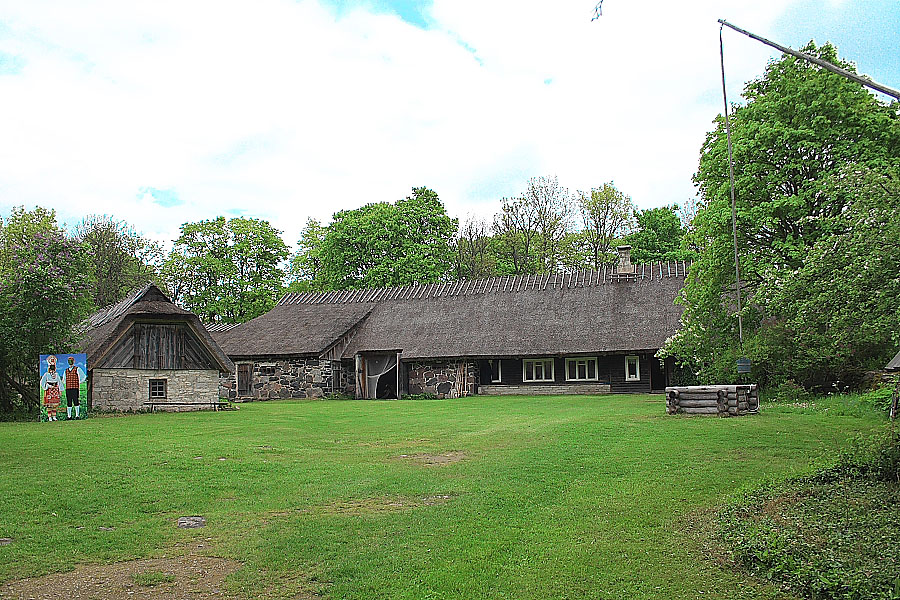
The Tooma farmstead at the Muhu Museum

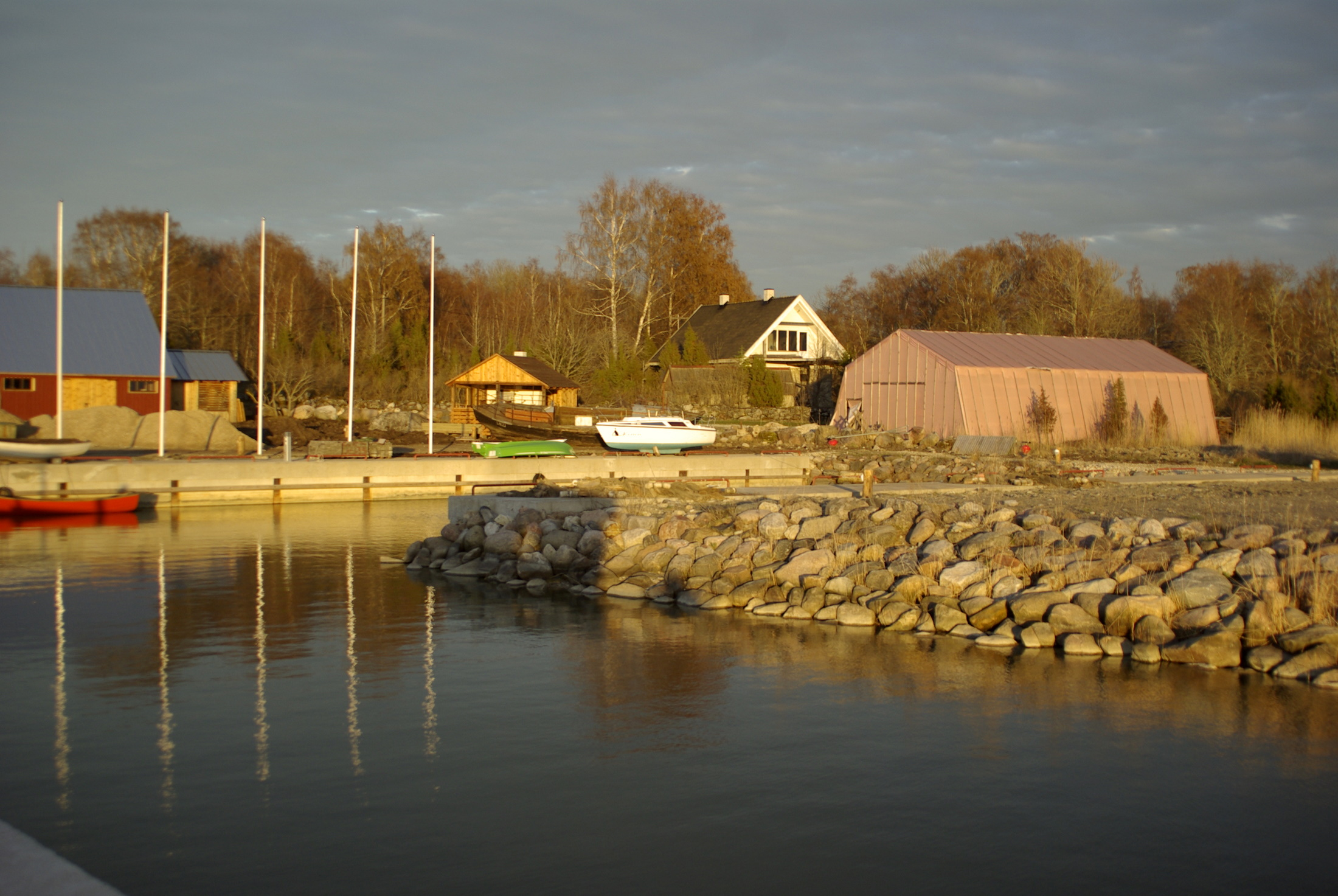
Koguva harbour

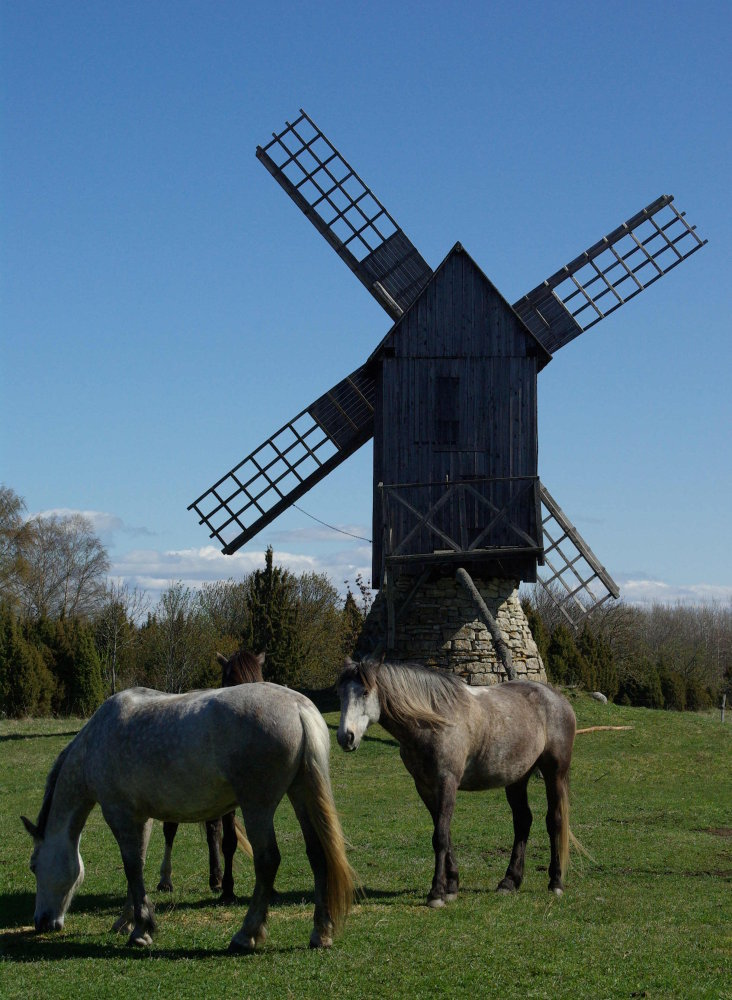
One of three windmills in Koguva

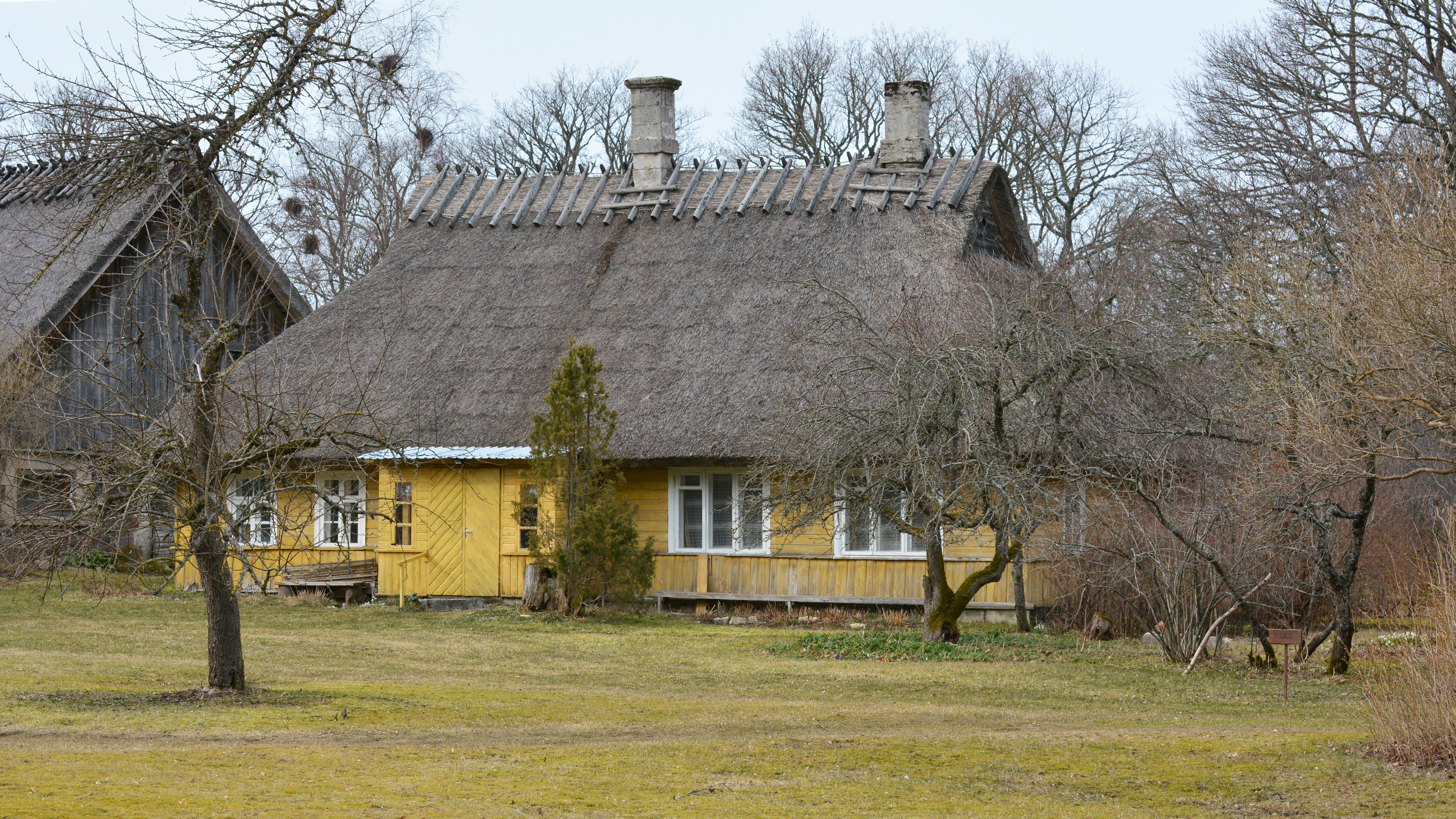
The Välja farmhouse

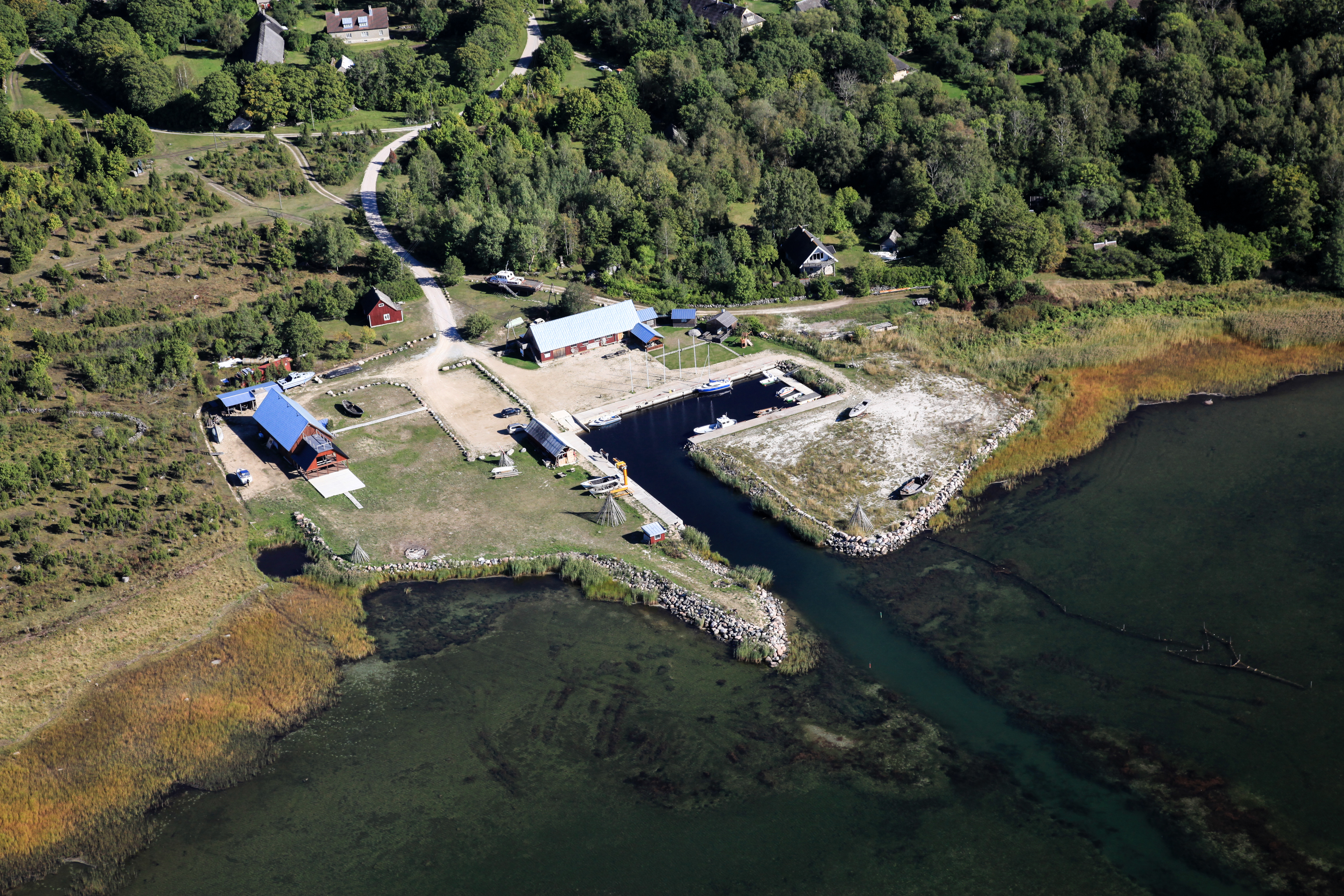
Koguva harbour (aerial view)
