= Viirelaid =

Island in Estonia

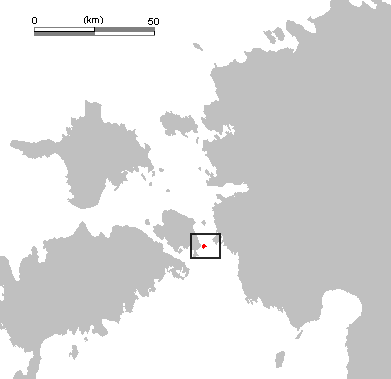
Viirelaid

Viirelaid, previously also known as Paternoster, is a small island of Estonia in the Baltic Sea. Viirelaid lies southeast of the island of Muhu. Together with Muhu and neighbouring small islands of Kesselaid, Võilaid and Suurlaid, it forms Muhu Parish (Estonian: Muhu vald), the rural municipality within Saare County, Estonia.

The area of the island is 81 hectares. It is up to 4.5 metres above sea level and is very flat. The island served in earlier times as an orientation point for the shipping industry.

On the island is a steel lighthouse called the Viirelaiu tuletorn, built in 1882 and renovated in 2004. Originally built in 1857 of timber, the structure is an 11-metre-high tower.

== See also ==
- List of islands of Estonia
