= Pädaste manor =

Manor in Estonia

Coordinates: 58°33′01″N 23°16′51″E

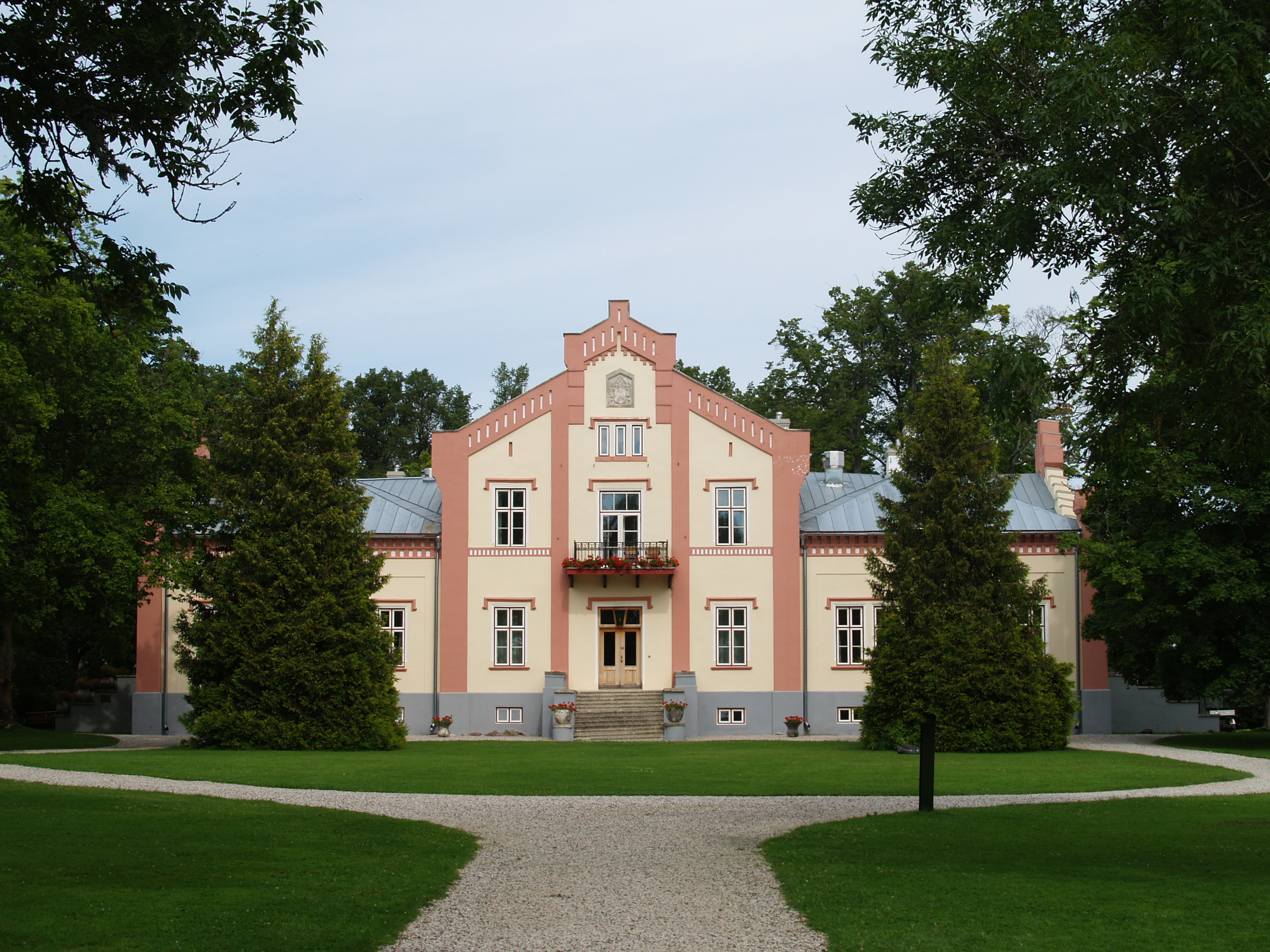
Pädaste manor main building

Pädaste manor is the only remaining manor house on Muhu island. It was established as a manorial estate in the village of Pädaste in the 16th century. The first owners were the Baltic German family von Knorring. Later, it has been the property of several different members of the Baltic nobility.

The estate was a profitable agricultural centre during especially the 18th century, with large rye fields, an orchard, sheep pastures, hayfields and birch forests. The manor house itself was originally constructed in wood. At least one of families that owned the estate did not ever live at the manor, and therefore little interest was for a long time given to the embellishment of the estate. In 1875, however the presently visible main building was erected. Apart from the main building, the estate also preserves many of the outbuildings, dating from approximately the same time.

The last owner before the Estonian Declaration of Independence and the subsequent sweeping land reform in 1919 which ended the centuries-long domination of a land-owning, German-speaking aristocracy, was Ernst Johann Bock. Its more recent history includes being used as a home for the disabled between 1950 and 1970.

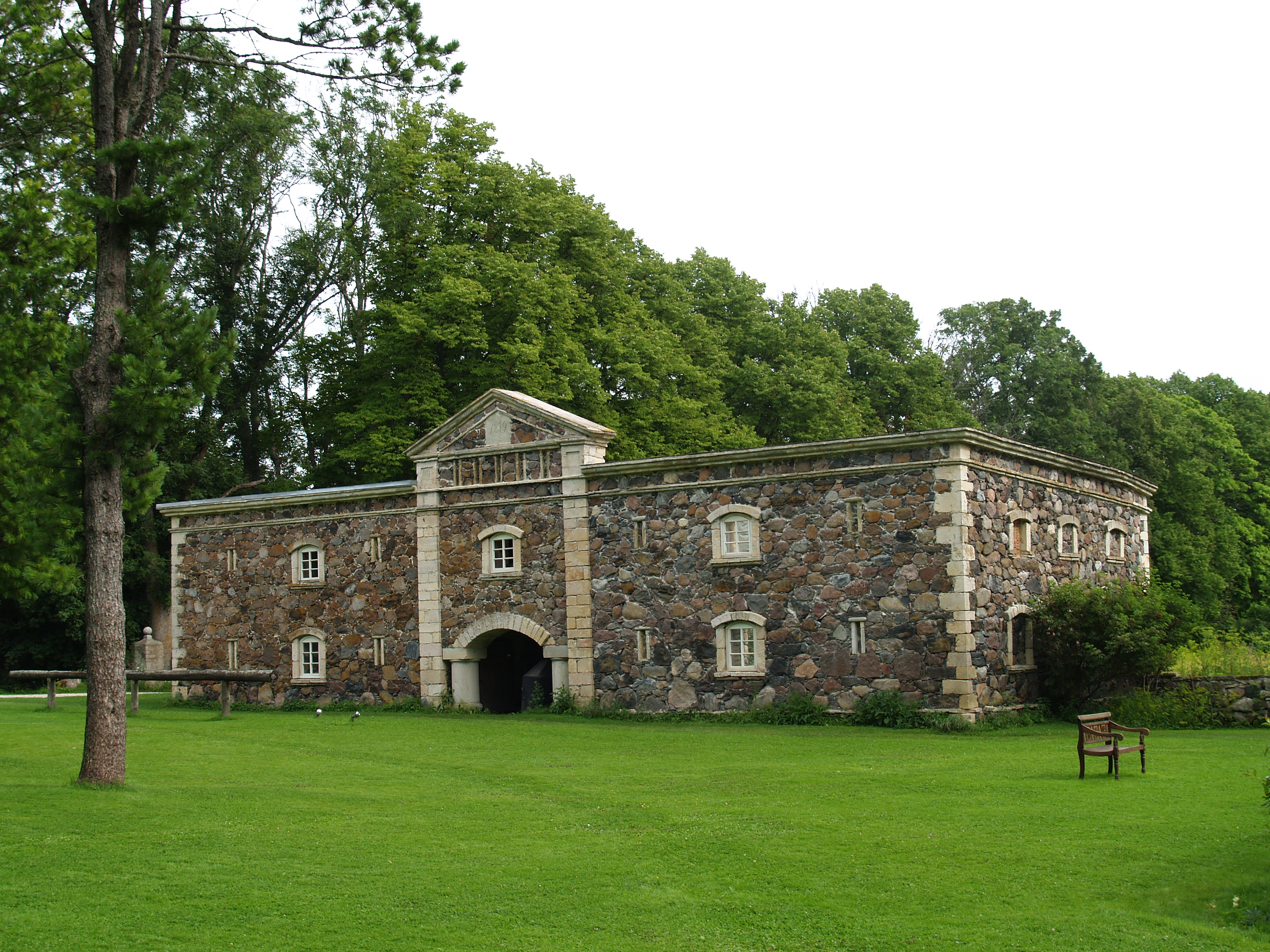
The manor granary.

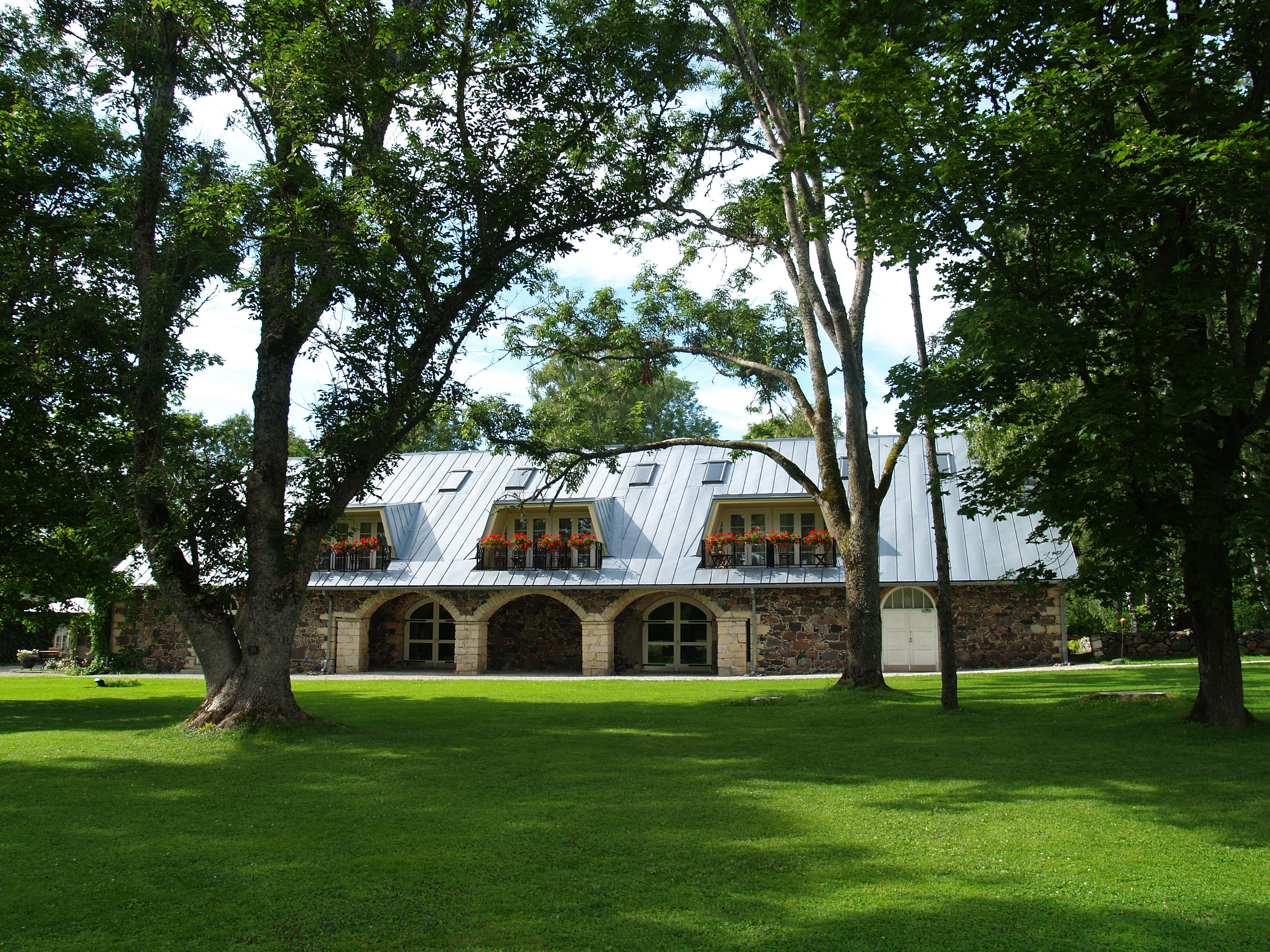
The manor stable and coach house.

Today, a renowned luxury hotel, spa and restaurant operates in the renovated manor. It has been praised by several well-known international magazines, including The Times, The Financial Times, Wall Street Journal, Berliner Zeitung and De Telegraaf. Guests have included queen Margrethe II of Denmark and Luciano Pavarotti.
