= Üügu Landscape Conservation Area =

Protected area in Estonia

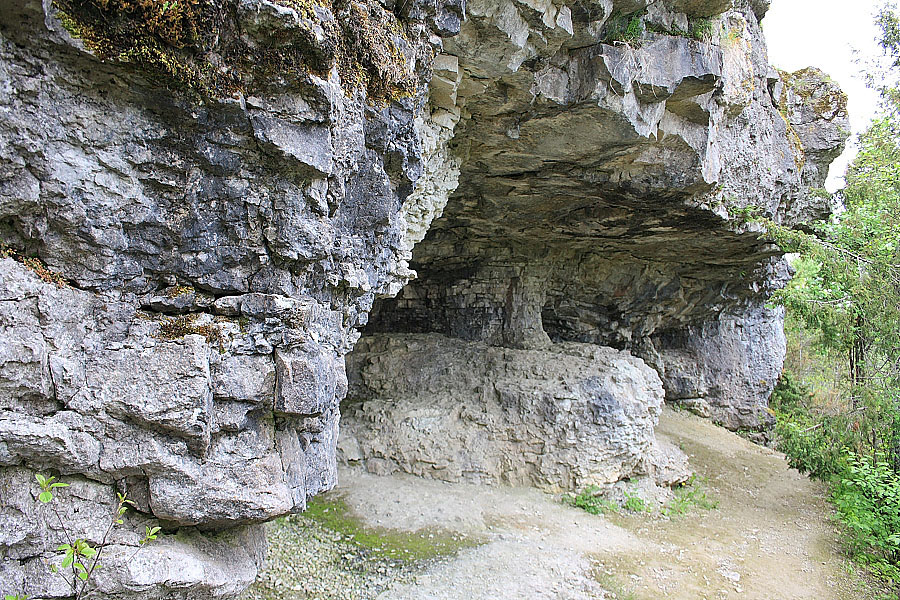
- Üügu Cliff

- Location within Estonia
- Location: Estonia
- Coordinates: 58°40′20″N 23°14′15″E
- Area: 0.1 ha (0.25 acres)
- Established: 1959 (2019)

Üügu Landscape Conservation Area is a nature reserve situated on Muhu Island, Saare County, Estonia.

Its area was 10.4 ha (26 acres) and from 2019, its area is 0.1 ha (0.25 acres).

The protected area was designated in 1959 to protect Üügu Cliff and its surroundings. In 2019, the protected area was redesigned to the landscape conservation area.
