= Juhan Smuul =

Estonian writer

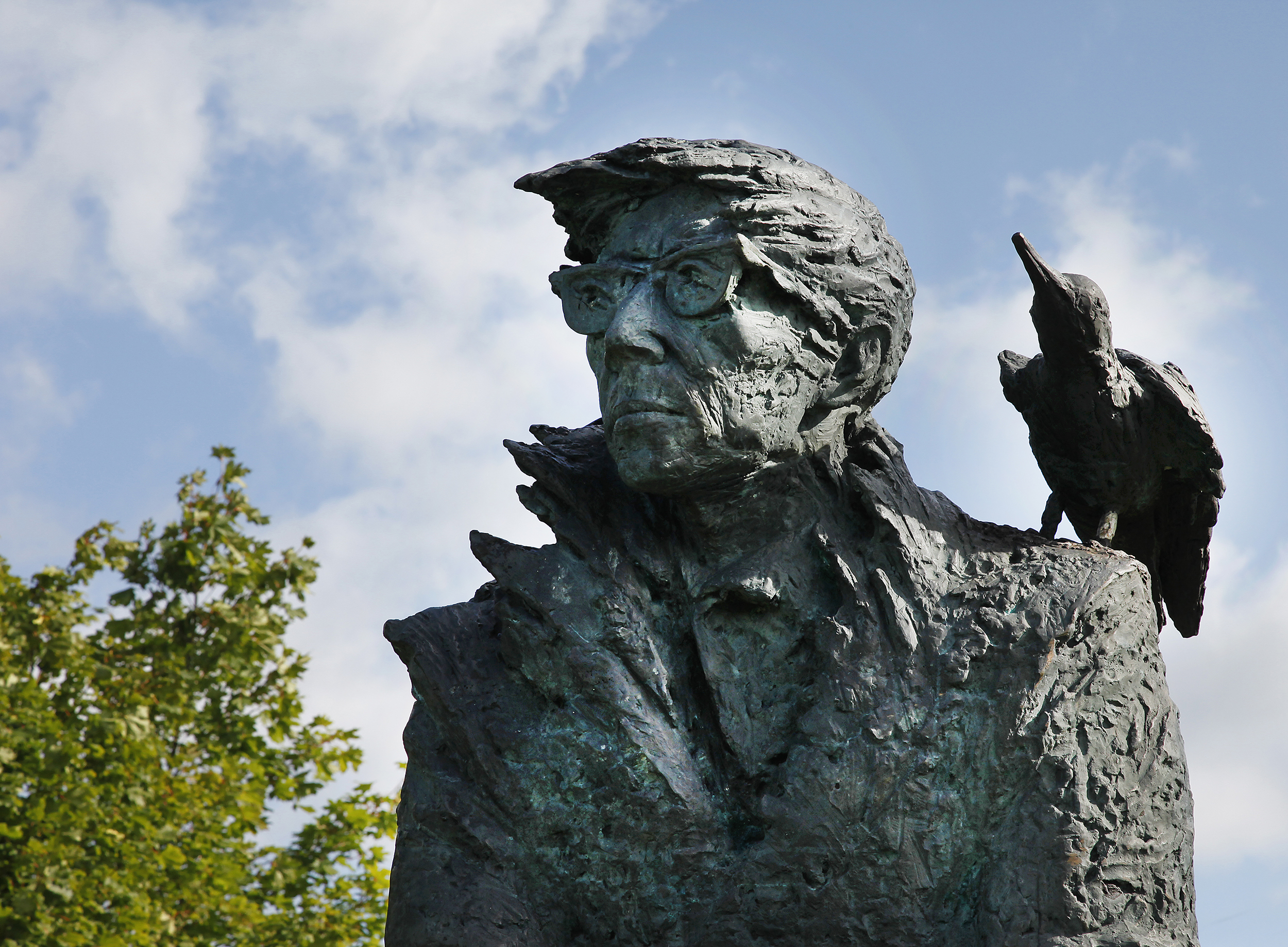
- Monument to Juhan Smuul
- Born: Johannes Schmuul; February 18, 1922; Koguva, Estonia
- Died: April 13, 1971 (aged 49); Tallinn, then part of Estonian SSR, Soviet Union
- Occupations: Writer, journalist
- Spouses: Ita Saks (m. 1945; div. 1951) Debora Vaarandi (m. 1952)
- Writing career
- Notable work: Jäine raamat (The Frozen Book)
- Notable awards: People's Writer of the Estonian SSR (1965)

Juhan Smuul (18 February 1922 – 13 April 1971) was an Estonian writer. Until 1954 he used the given name Johannes Schmuul. Smuul was one of the most recognized writers in Soviet Estonia and was a member of the Central Committee of the Communist Party of Estonia, a deputy of the Supreme Soviet of the Soviet Union and the Supreme Soviet of the Estonian SSR, chairman of the Estonian Writers' Union, secretary of the board of the Union of Soviet Writers.

== Career ==
Smuul was born in the village of Koguva on the island of Muhu to Jüri Schmuul (1863–1940) and Ruudu Schmuul (née Tuulik, 1882–1969). He had three older sisters: Salme, Linda, and Liisa, and one younger sister, Aliide, as well as six half-siblings from his father's first marriage. His cousins were writers Jüri and Ülo Tuulik.

He wrote several novels, often based on life on his native island of Muhu. He also authored several travelogues. His best-known work is The Frozen Book (Jäine raamat), about a Soviet expedition to Antarctica. Smuul also wrote four screenplays. They are:

- Kirjad Sõgedate külast (1966)
- Keskpäevane praam (1967)
- Metskapten (1971)
- Siin me oleme! (1978) (TV)

Juhan Smuul was an active Marxist–Leninist. In 1949, he participated in the Soviet repression campaign of deporting Estonians into eastern parts of Russia.

He also worked in Soviet Estonian journalism. He died in Tallinn.

== Recognition ==
Smuul was named People's Writer of the Estonian SSR in 1965. He was also awarded the Stalin Prize in 1952, the Lenin Prize in 1961, and the Order of Lenin in 1967.

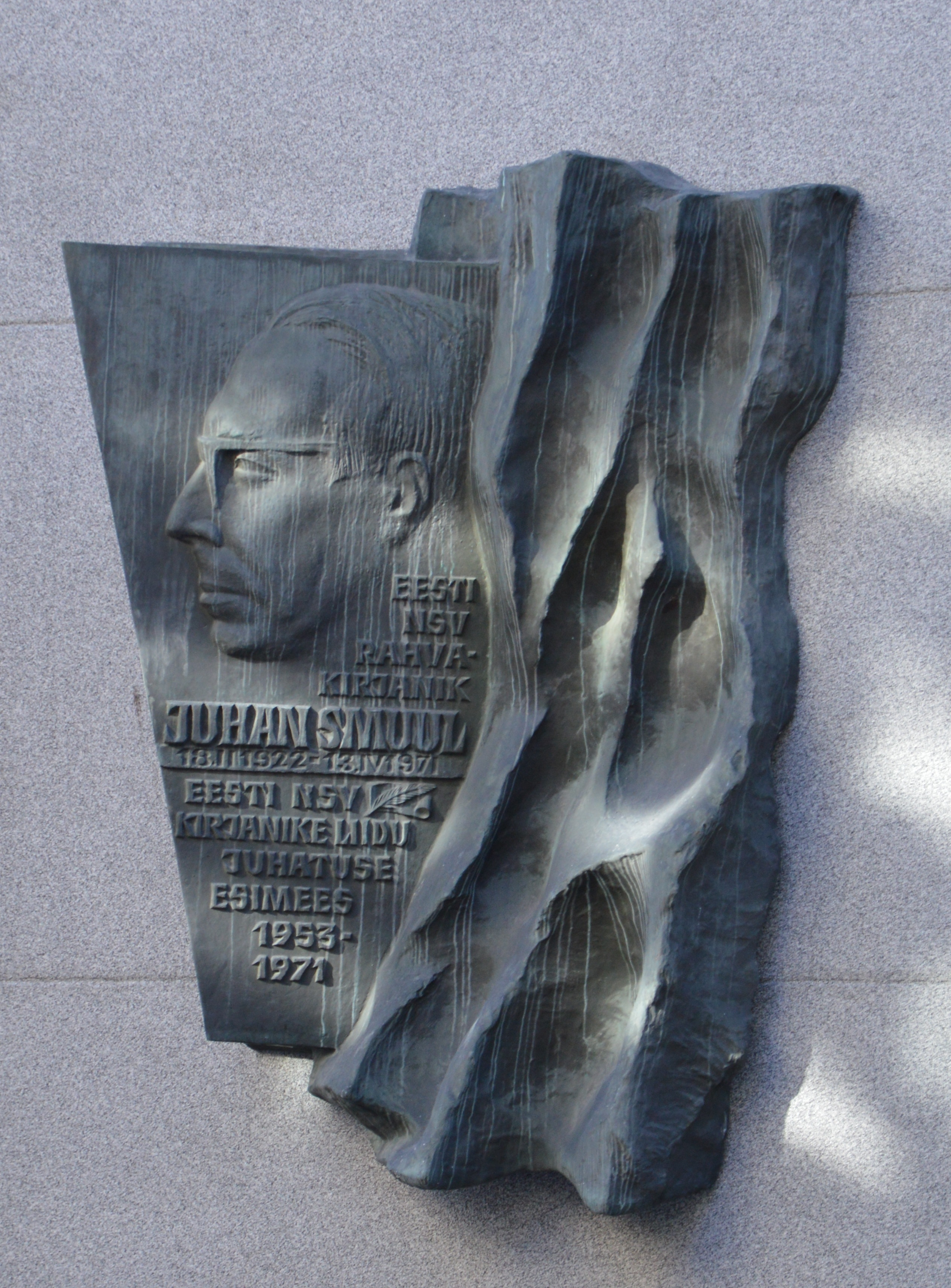
Memorial plaque of Juhan Smuul in Tallinn

The literary award of the Estonian SSR (Eesti NSV kirjanduse aastapreemia) was named after him in 1972 and became the Juhan Smuul literary award from then on.

The Smuul family home, the Tooma farm (Estonian: Tooma talu), located in the village of Koguva, is a museum. Some streets in Estonia are named after him, and one of the districts of Kuressaare is also named after him.

In February 1972, a bas-relief of Smuul created by the sculptor Matti Varik and the architect Allan Murdmaa was unveiled on the wall of the Writers' House in Tallinn's Old Town. After Smuul's role in the 1949 deportation of Estonians came to light in 2023, there were calls to remove the sculpture. Instead, in 2024, the Writers' Union decided to install a plaque below the bust with a QR code explaining Smuul's complicity.

== Personal life ==
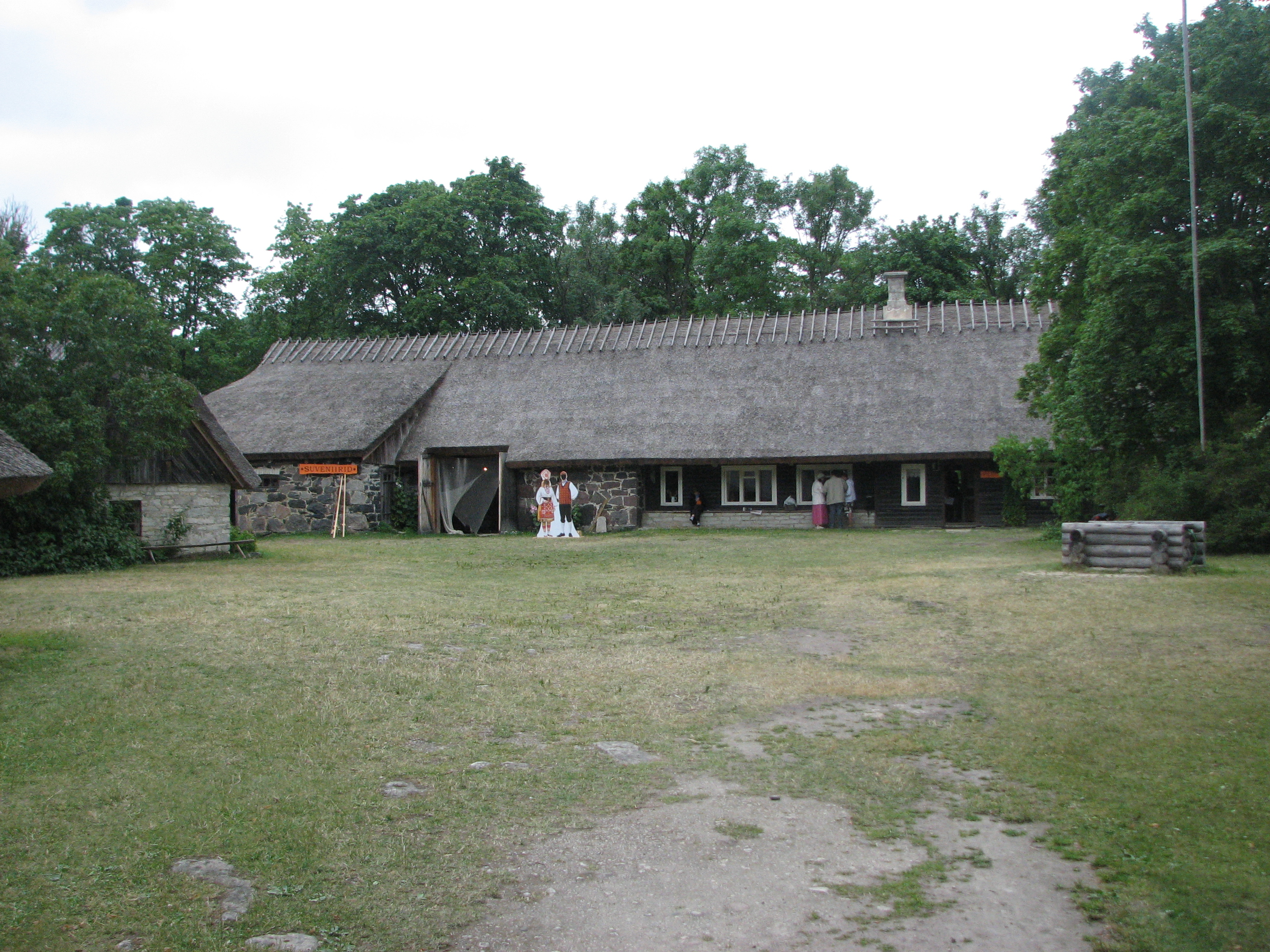
The Tooma farm in Koguva, the birthplace of Juhan Smuul

Juhan Smuul was married first to the translator Ita Saks from 1945 until 1951. After divorcing, he married the poet Debora Vaarandi. Before his death, he lived for three or four years with the radio and Finnish-language television editor Ellen Noot. He had no children.
