= Ita Saks =

Estonian translator and journalist

Ita Saks (3 December 1921 – 23 March 2003) was an Estonian translator and journalist. She is mainly known for her Latvian-language translations into Estonian.

Saks was born into a Jewish family in Valga. From 1950 until 1956, she studied Estonian philology at Tartu State University.

In 1980 she signed the letter of 40 intellectuals.

== Personal life ==
Saks married the writer Juhan Smuul in 1945. The couple divorced in 1951. Afterward, she was in a relationship with the writer Aadu Hint, with whom she had a daughter, the translator Mare Zaneva. Real estate investor Georgi Zanev is her grandson.

== Awards ==
- 1986: Andrejs Upīts Award
- 1997: Order of the Three Stars
- 2001: Order of the White Star, Fifth Class.
