= Pädaste =

Village in Estonia

- Village
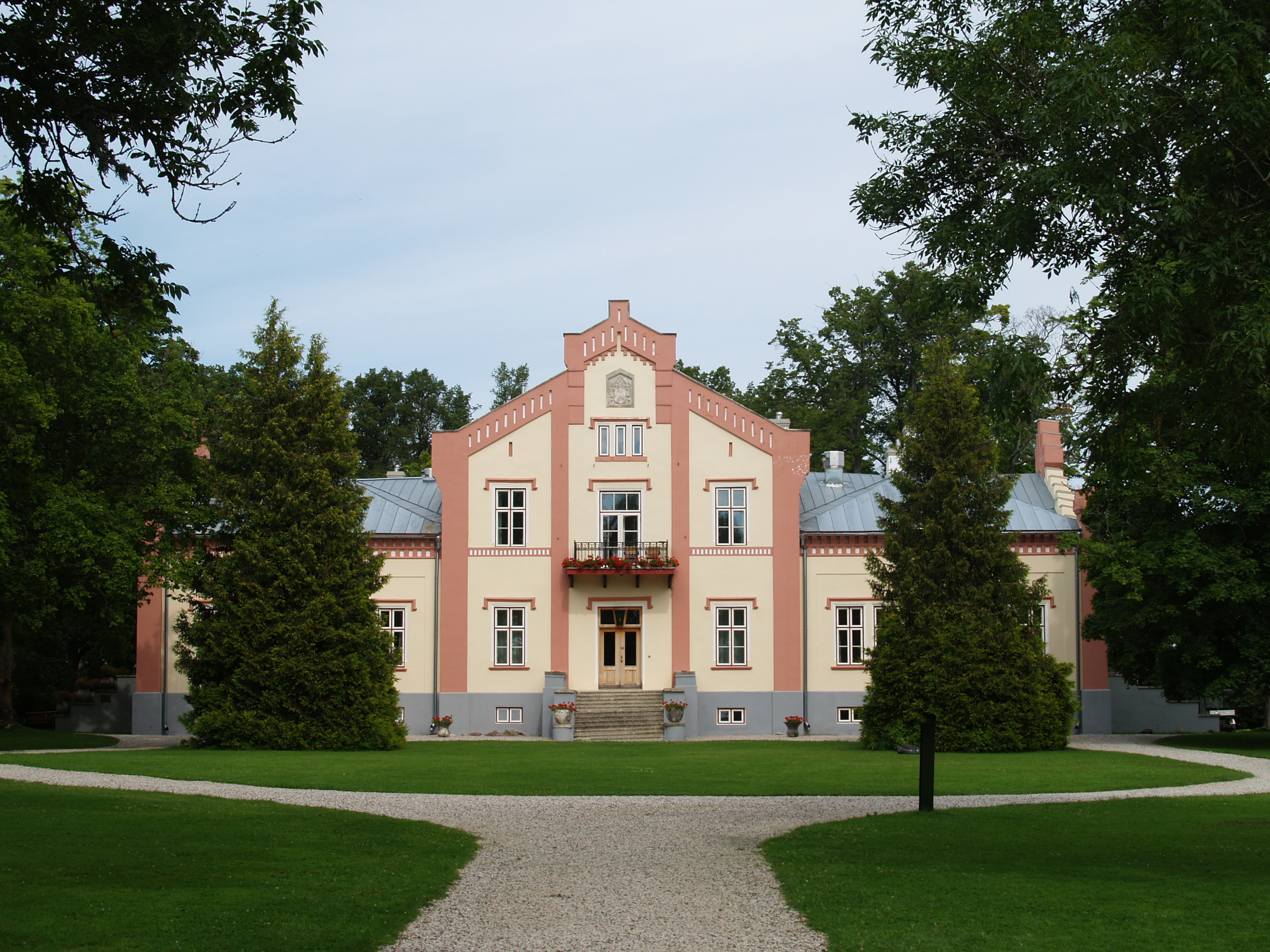
- Pädaste Manor

- Location in Estonia
- Coordinates: 58°33′05″N 23°16′47″E
- Country: Estonia
- County: Saare County
- Municipality: Muhu Parish
- First mentioned: 1566

Population (01.01.2000)
  - Total: 48

Pädaste (German: Peddast) is a village on the Estonian island of Muhu. It is located on the southern coast of the island on Pädaste Bay (Estonian: Pädaste laht) in the northern part of the Gulf of Riga. Administratively, Pädaste belongs to Muhu Parish, Saare County. In 2000, the village had a population of 48.

Pädaste is best known for its eclectic manor house, Pädaste manor. Pädaste manor is the only remaining manor house on Muhu island. It was established as a manorial estate in the 16th century.
