= Kõinastu =

Island in Estonia

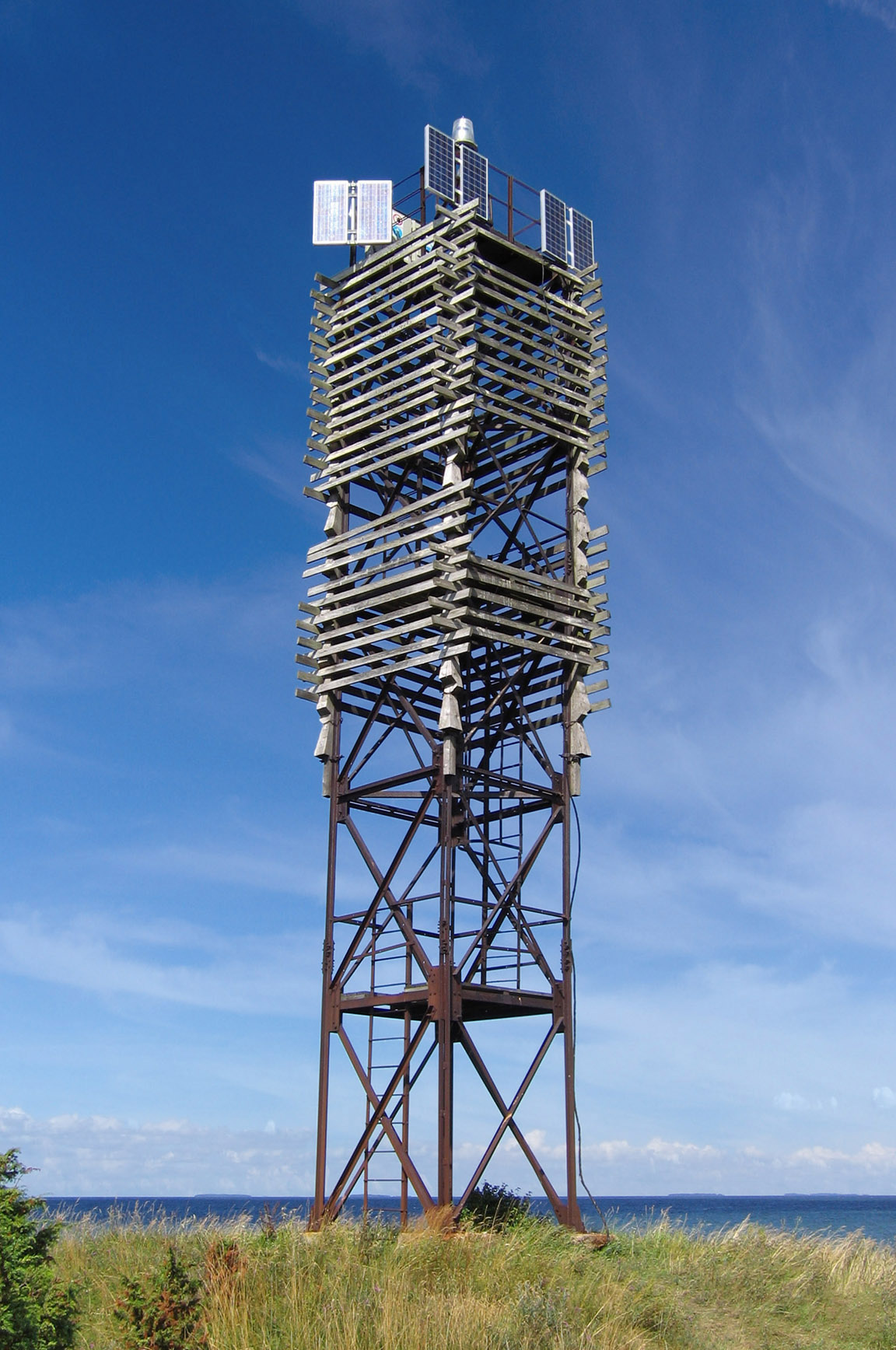
- Kõinastu light beacon

- Location in Estonia
- Coordinates: 58°38′07″N 23°00′53″E
- Country: Estonia
- County: Saare County
- Municipality: Saaremaa Parish

Area
  - Total: 2.62 km^{2} (1.01 sq mi)

Population (01.01.2011)
  - Total: 4
  - Density: 1.5/km^{2} (4.0/sq mi)

Kõinastu is a 2.62 km² islet in the southern part of the Väinameri Sea, Estonia. Administratively, it forms Kõinastu village which is part of Saaremaa Parish, Saare County. Kõinastu has a population of 4, as of 1 January 2011. There is a light beacon on Kõinastu.
