= Kesselaid =

Village in Estonia

Kesse
- village
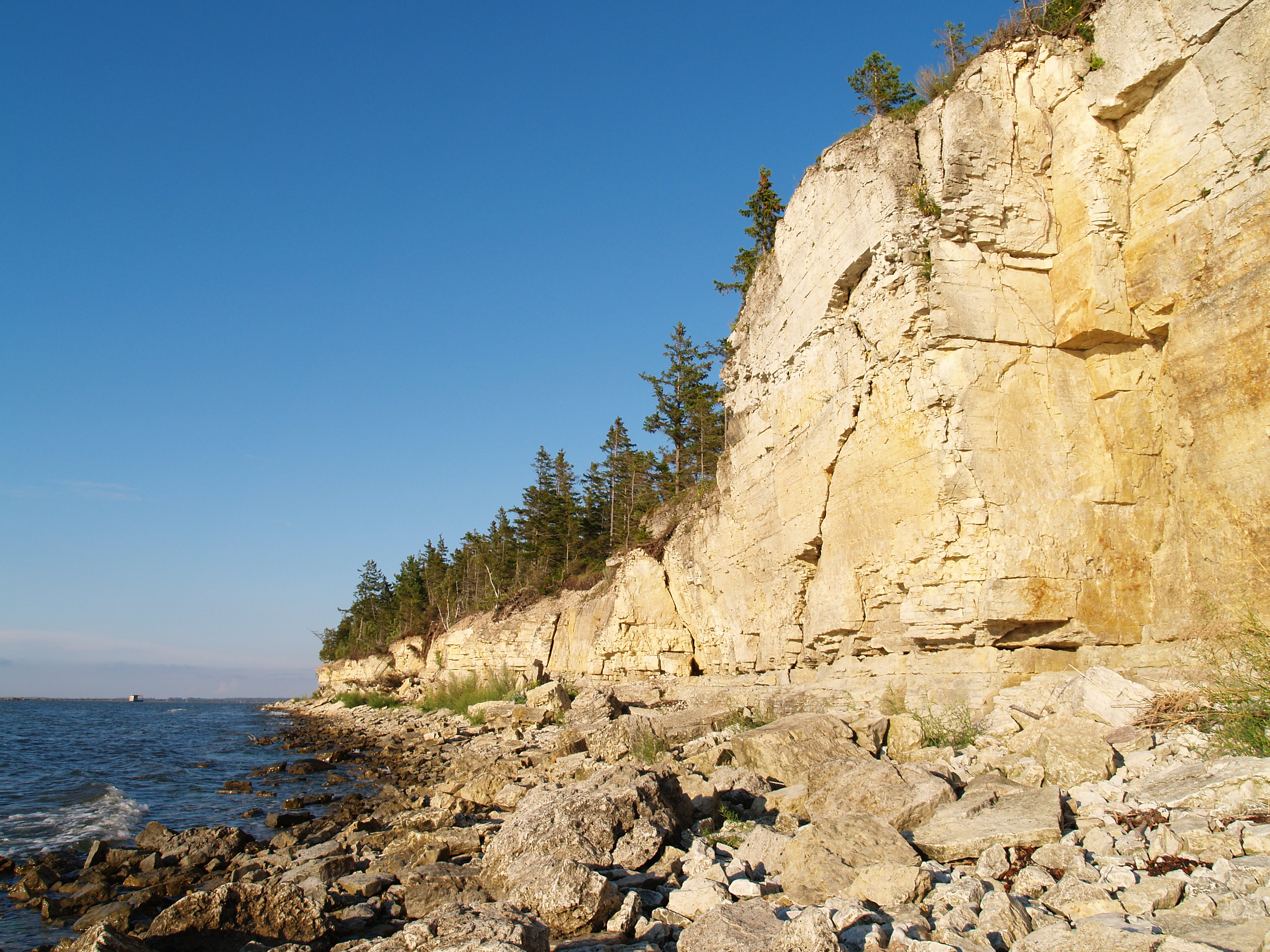
- Kesse cliff on the northwestern side of the island.

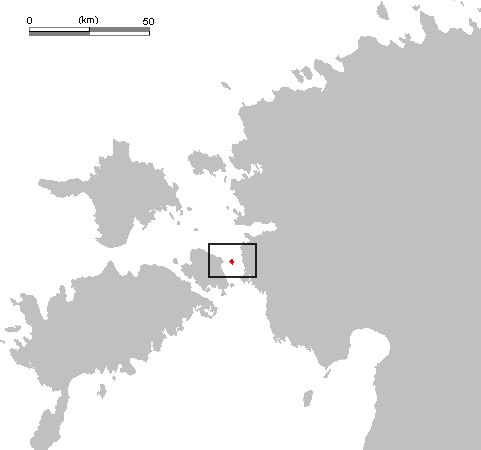
- Kesselaid in the West Estonian archipelago.
- Coordinates: 58°38′04″N 23°25′57″E
- Country: Estonia
- County: Saare County
- Municipality: Muhu Parish

Area
  - Total: 1.7 km^{2} (0.66 sq mi)

Population
  - Total: 2
  - Density: 1.2/km^{2} (3.0/sq mi)

Kesselaid (also Kessulaid, or diminutively Kessu. German: Schildau; Swedish: Sköld, Skölldo) is a 1.7 km^{2} (0.66 sq mi) Estonian islet located between the mainland and the island of Muhu in the Suur Strait (Big Strait) which connects the Väinameri strait and the Gulf of Riga. There is only one village on the island Kesse, which is administratively part of Muhu Parish, Saare County.

With the highest point 15.6 m above sea level, it is the highest islet of Estonia. It is also considered to be the oldest islet, as it arose from the sea around 3000 BC.

Since 1938, the 7 to 8 feet high cliffs of Kesselaid have been designated a nature reserve.

Kesselaid was first described in print in 1644 in the Swedish maritime book Een siö-book, som innehåller om siöfarten i Östersiön by Johan Månsson. Kesselaid had been inhabited by ethnic Estonians for centuries but heavy colonization by German settlers began in the 16th century. In 1807, Kesselaid was sold to the Baltic German noble Jacob Friedrich von Helwig. By the end of the 1930s, there were still 35 permanent residents on the island.

Today, in summer Kesselaid is partly used as pasture and grazing land for cattle and goats. It has also become an excursion destination for nature tourists. On the island, 16 species of orchids are counted. From the island of Muhu, wild boar and elk occasionally swim to Kesselaid.

A lighthouse was first built on Kesselaid in 1885. The current, fully automated lighthouse dates to 1994.

== Gallery ==
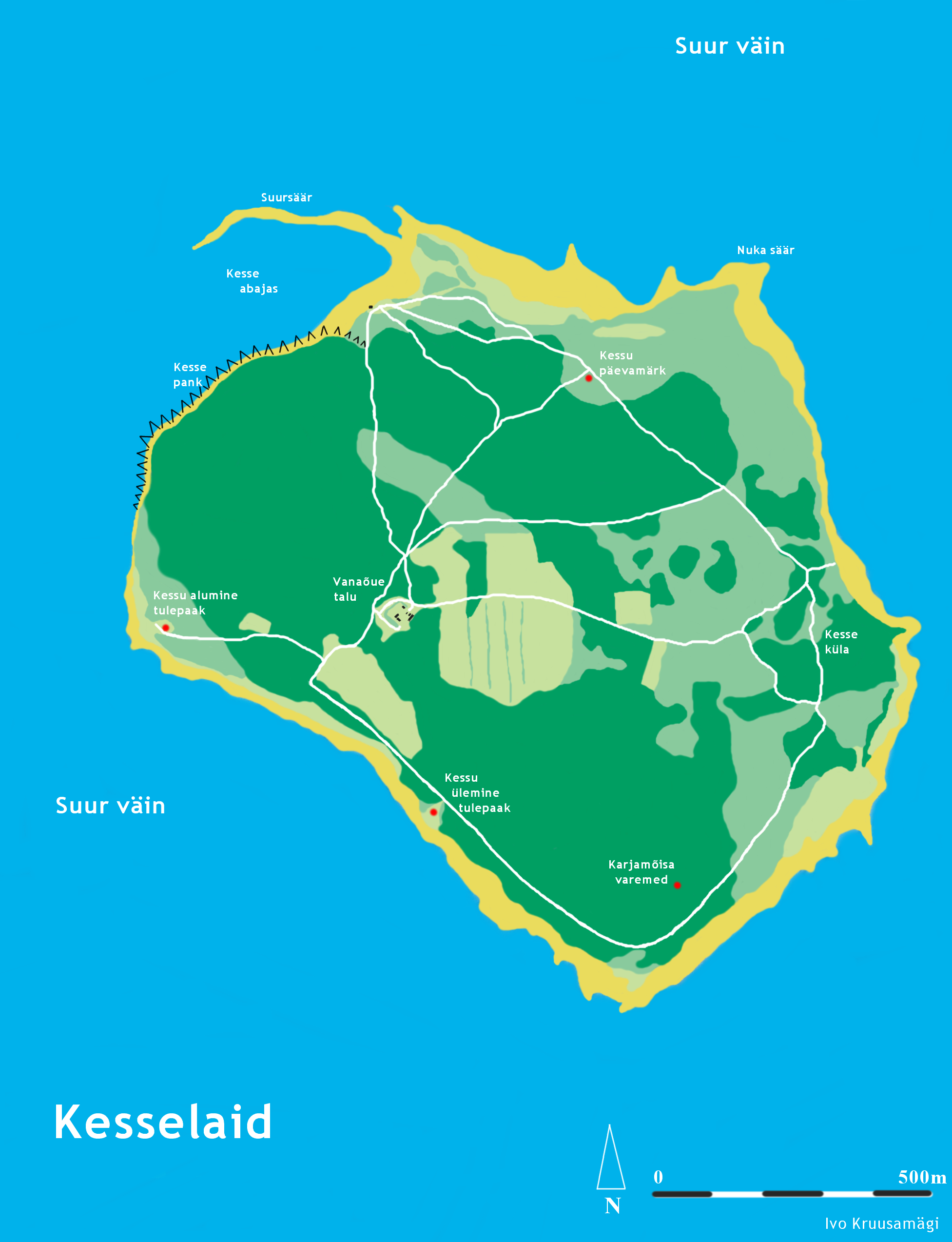
Map of Kesselaid

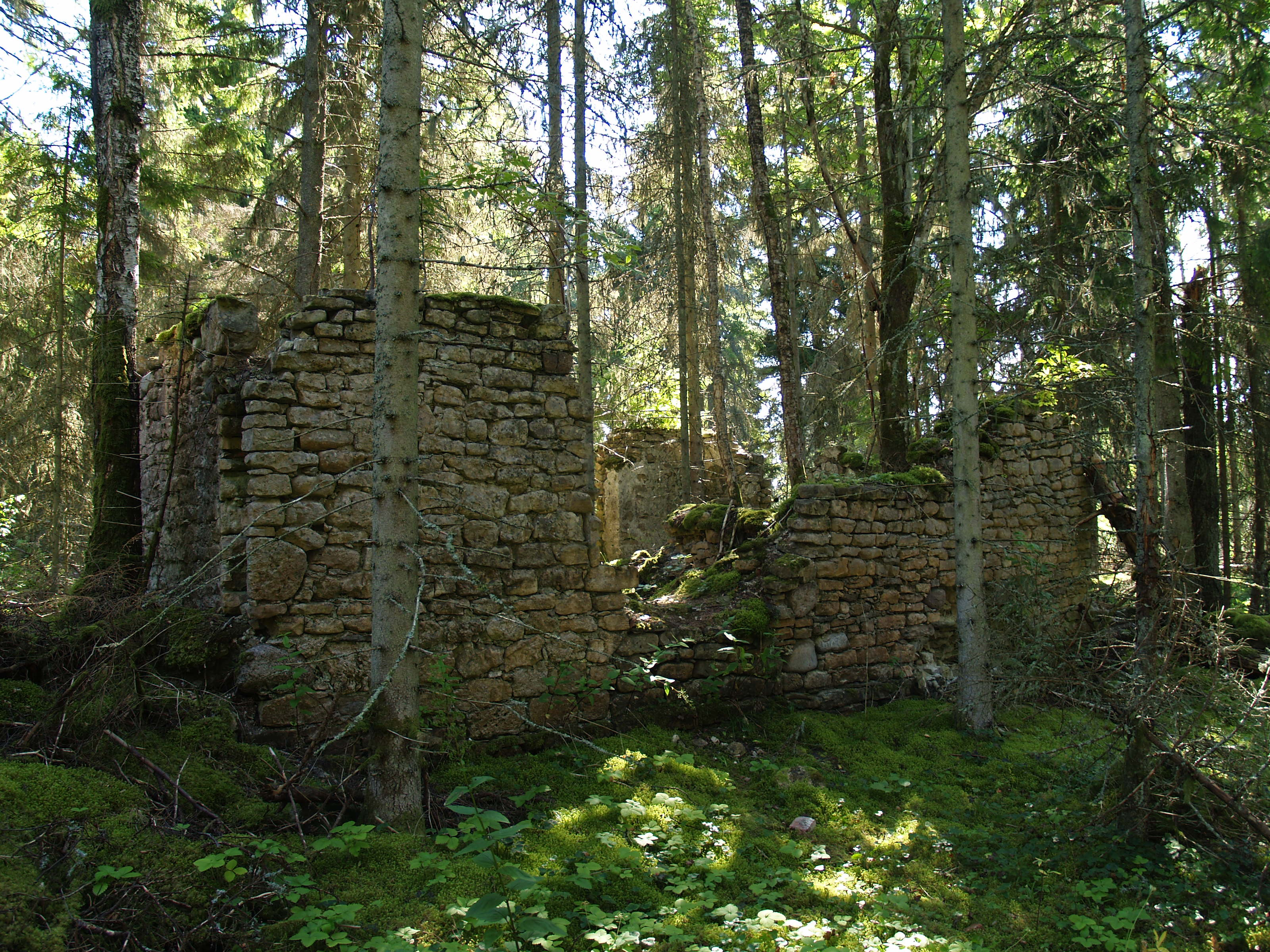
Remains of the cattle manor founded in 1807.

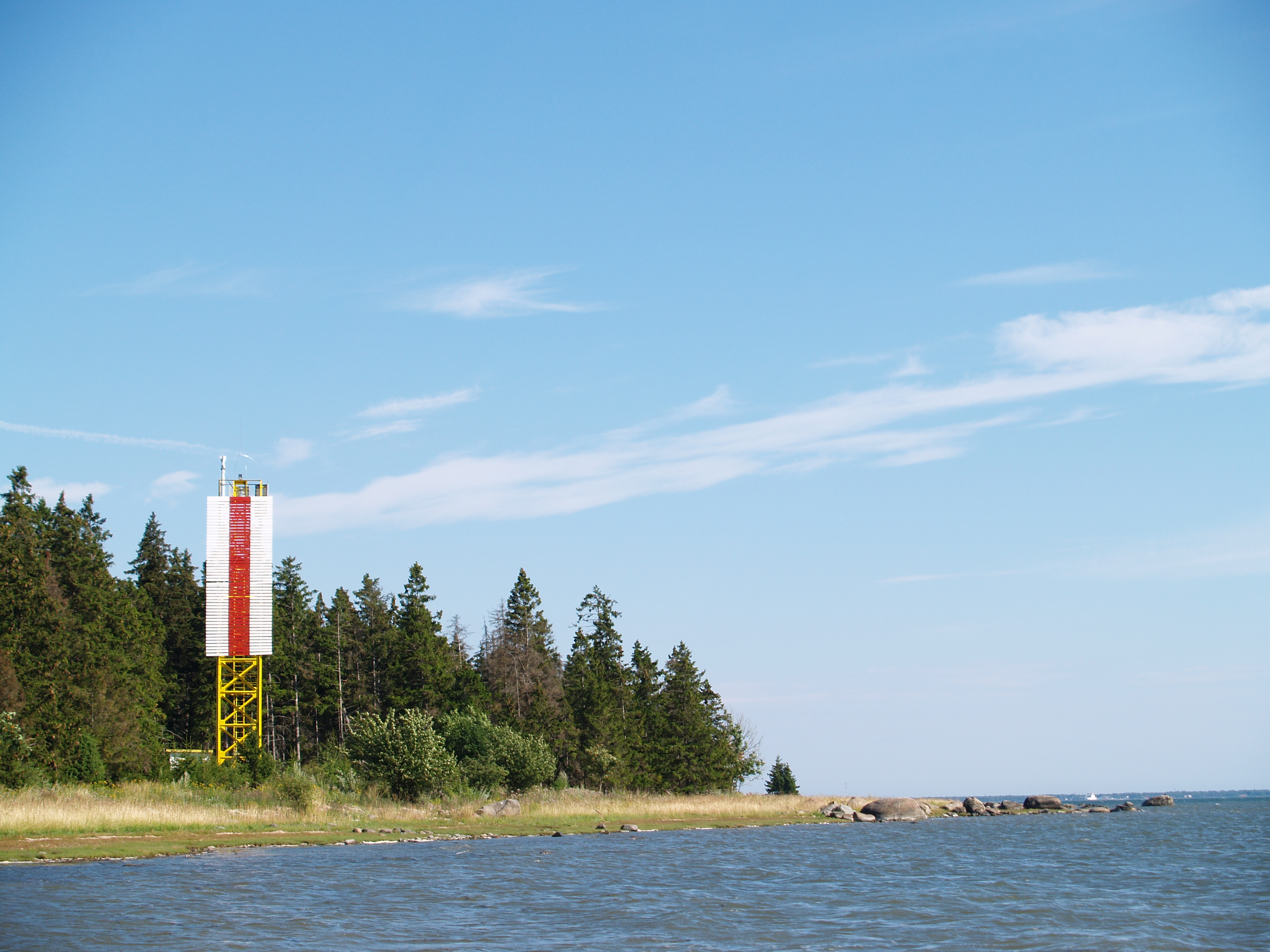
Upper lighthouse

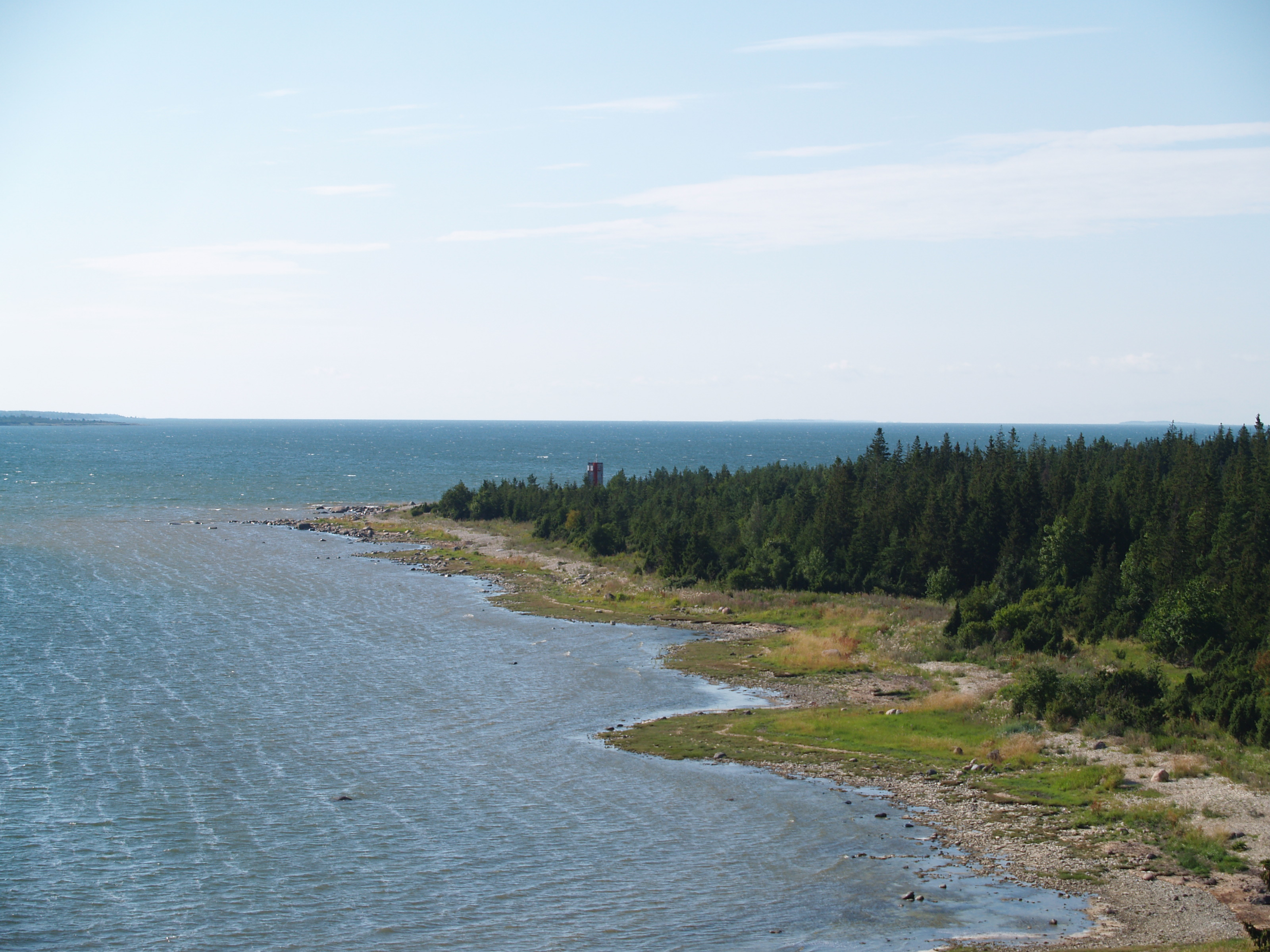
Coastline

== See also ==
- List of islands of Estonia
