= Muhu =

Baltic Sea island of Estonia

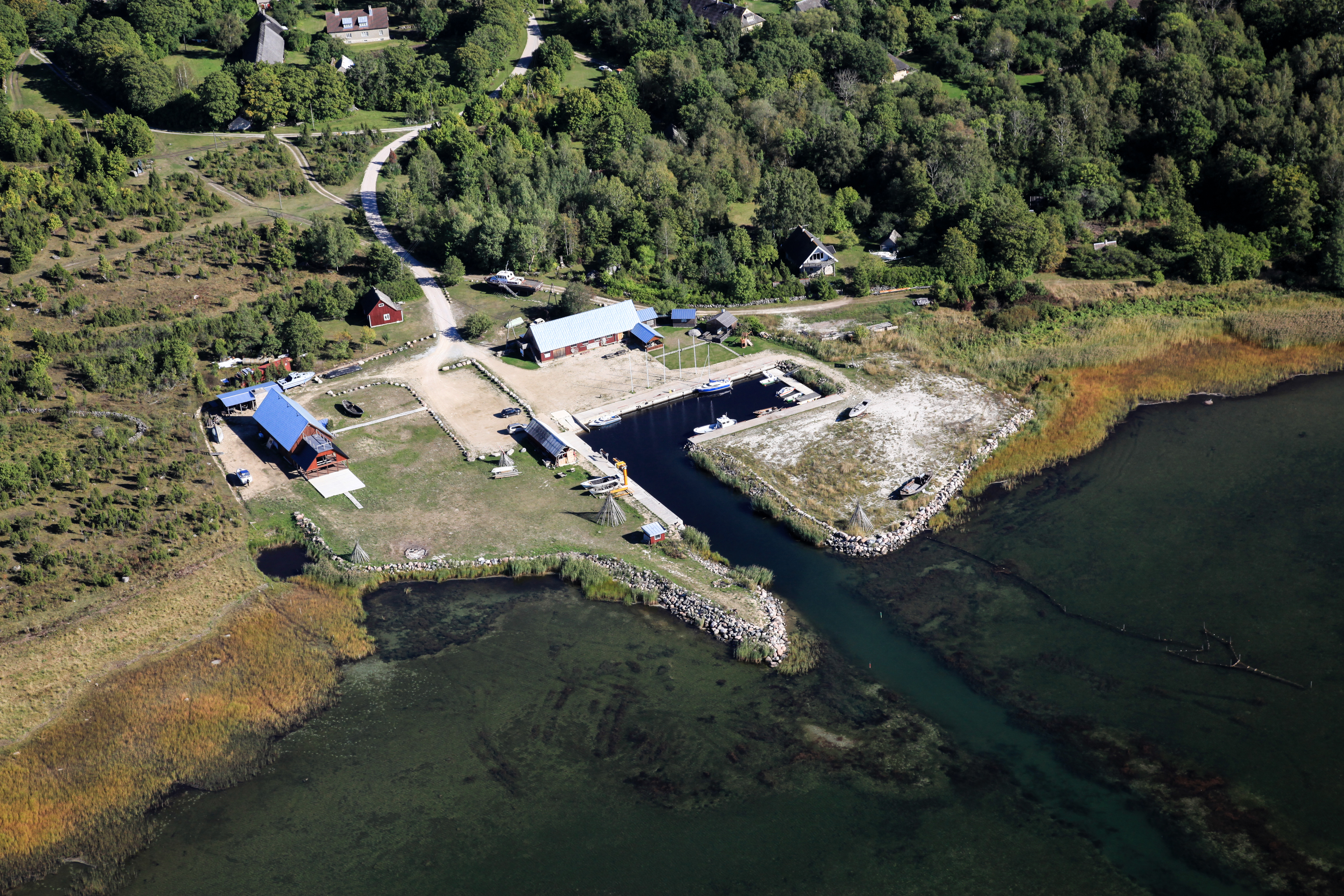
- Koguva harbour, Muhu

- Location within Estonia Muhu (Europe)

Geography
- Location: Baltic Sea
- Coordinates: 58°35′46″N 23°14′16″E
- Archipelago: West Estonian archipelago
- Area: 208 km^{2} (80 sq mi)

Administration
- Estonia
- County: Saare County
- Largest settlement: Liiva

Demographics
- Population: 2,142 (2026)
- Pop. density: 10.3/km^{2} (26.7/sq mi)
- Ethnic groups: Majority Estonians

Muhu (also called Muhu island) is an island of Estonia in the West Estonian archipelago of the Baltic Sea. With an area of 208 km^{2} (80 sq mi), it is the third-largest island of Estonia after Saaremaa and Hiiumaa. The island consists of 52 villages which are under Muhu municipality and has a population of 2,142 as of January 2026.

== Geography ==
Together with the neighbouring islets of Kesselaid, Viirelaid, Võilaid and Suurlaid, Muhu forms Muhu municipality, a rural municipality in Saare County. The German names for the island are Mohn and Moon. Moon is also the Swedish name for the island. The main settlements are Kuivastu (ferry harbour), Liiva (administrative centre) and Koguva (traditional village ensemble and the Muhu Museum).

The island is divided from mainland Estonia by the Big Strait (Estonian: Suur väin) and from Saaremaa by the Little Strait (Estonian: Väike väin). The Sea of Straits (Estonian: Väinameri, German: Moonsund, Moon Sound) lies north of the island. The island also has the Üügu Nature Reserve.

== History ==
In January 1227, an army of the Livonian Brothers of the Sword with Letts, Germans of Riga and native Livonians (20,000 men commanded by William of Modena) crossed on sea ice from the mainland and attacked the island of Saaremaa to reduce the last holdout of pagan Estonians. The Estonians surrendered on Muhu at a circular stronghold called Mona, the earthworks of which are still preserved near the causeway between the islands. This ended the Estonian Crusade.

The Battle of Karuse or Battle on the Ice was fought on 16 February 1270 between the Grand Duchy of Lithuania and the Livonian Order on the frozen Baltic Sea between Muhu and the mainland. The Lithuanians achieved a decisive victory. The battle, named after the village of Karuse, was the fifth-largest defeat of the Livonian or Teutonic Orders in the 13th century.

The same waters also saw the Battle of Moon Sound during World War I in September–October 1917 between Russian and German naval forces.

== Transport ==
Väinatamm causeway

Muhu is linked to the mainland by frequent car-and-passenger ferries between Virtsu (mainland) and Kuivastu (Muhu), operated by TS Laevad; schedules and ticketing are provided via the official portal praamid.ee. Muhu is connected to Saaremaa by the Väinatamm causeway, opened in 1896. During cold winters, the Estonian Transport Administration may open official ice roads, but openings are infrequent and subject to strict rules; travellers should rely on current official notices. There are direct, regular flights from Tallinn to Kuressaare, Saaremaa. It takes approximately one hour by car from Kuressaare Airport to Muhu. Direct flights from Helsinki in Finland were announced in 2026.

== Culture ==
The Muhu St. Catherine's Church (Estonian: Muhu Katariina kirik), is a medieval Lutheran church on the island. Muhu is known for having the only traditional windmills in Estonia that are still operational. It is also known for its traditional knitted stockings. In Pädaste, a luxury hotel and spa operated in the restored manor house, before it was closed to public in October 2025. Muhu is also the home of Estonia's first wine tourism farm: Luscher & Matiesen Muhu Winehouse.

== Gallery ==
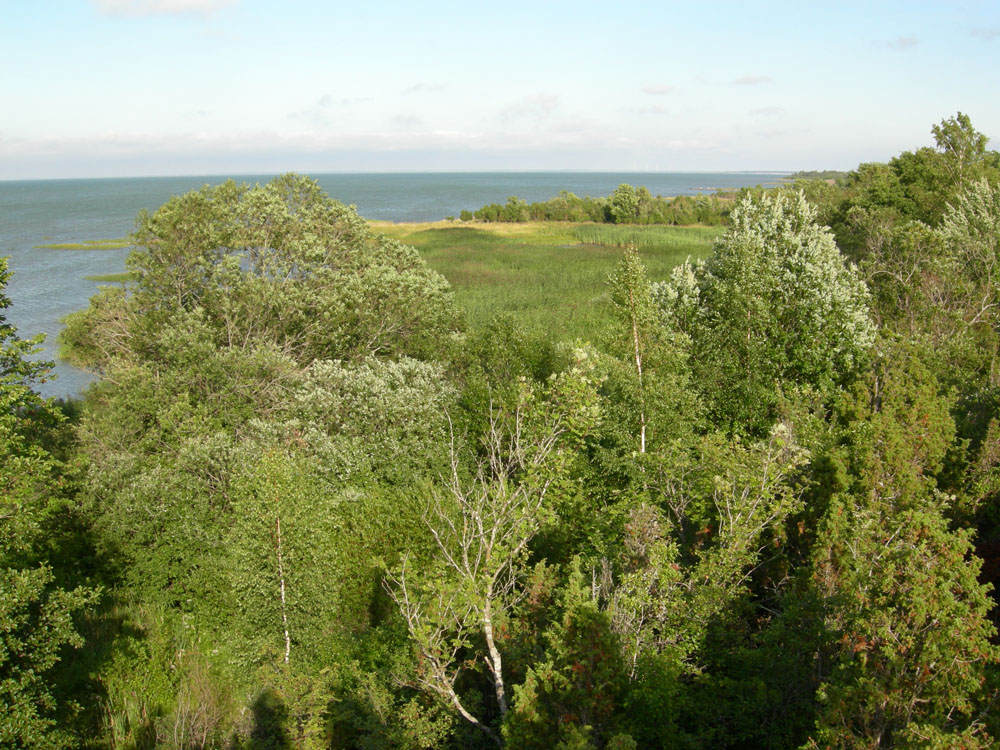
Northern coast of Muhu

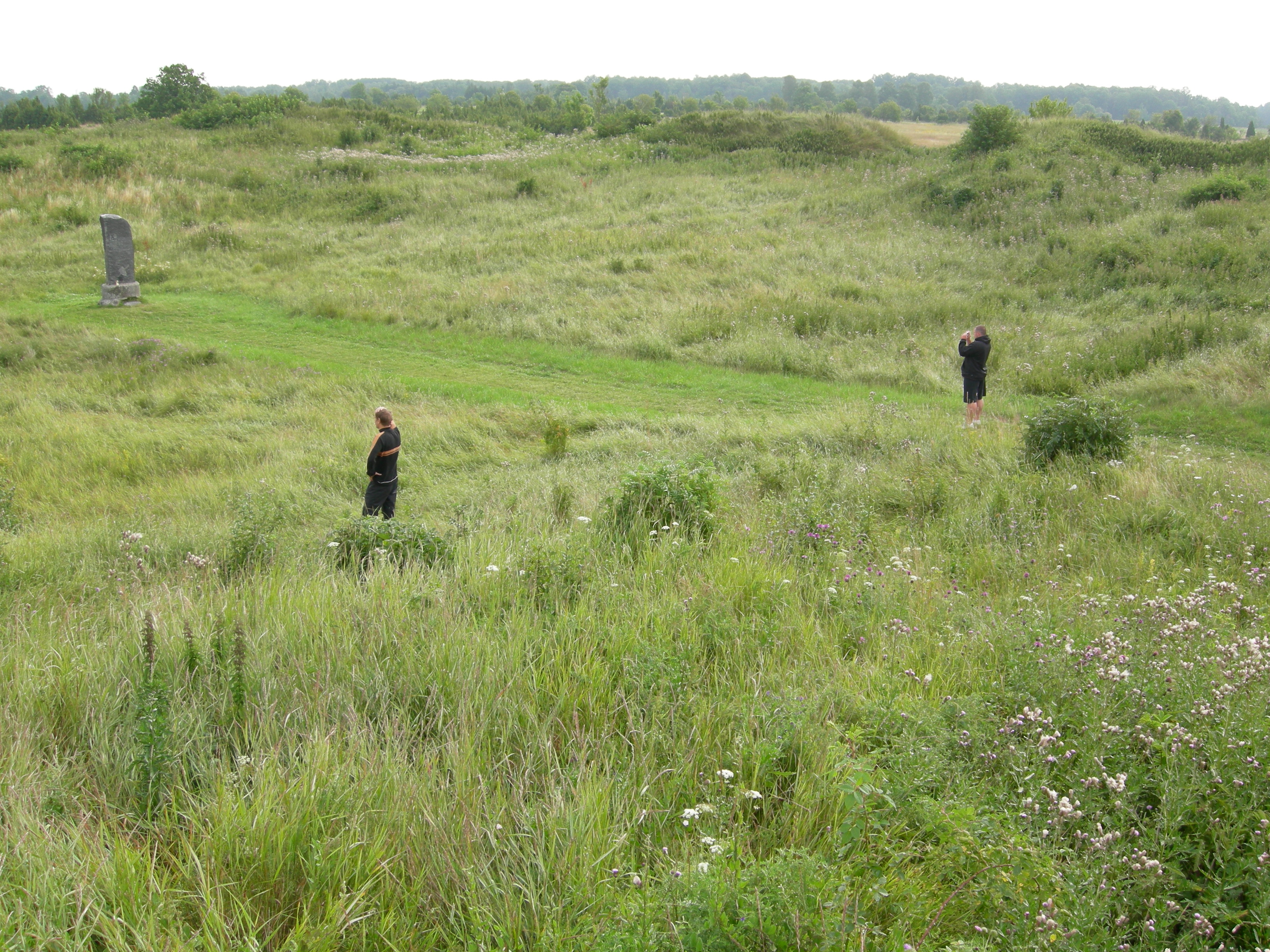
Muhu Stronghold, site of the native Estonian surrender to crusaders in 1227

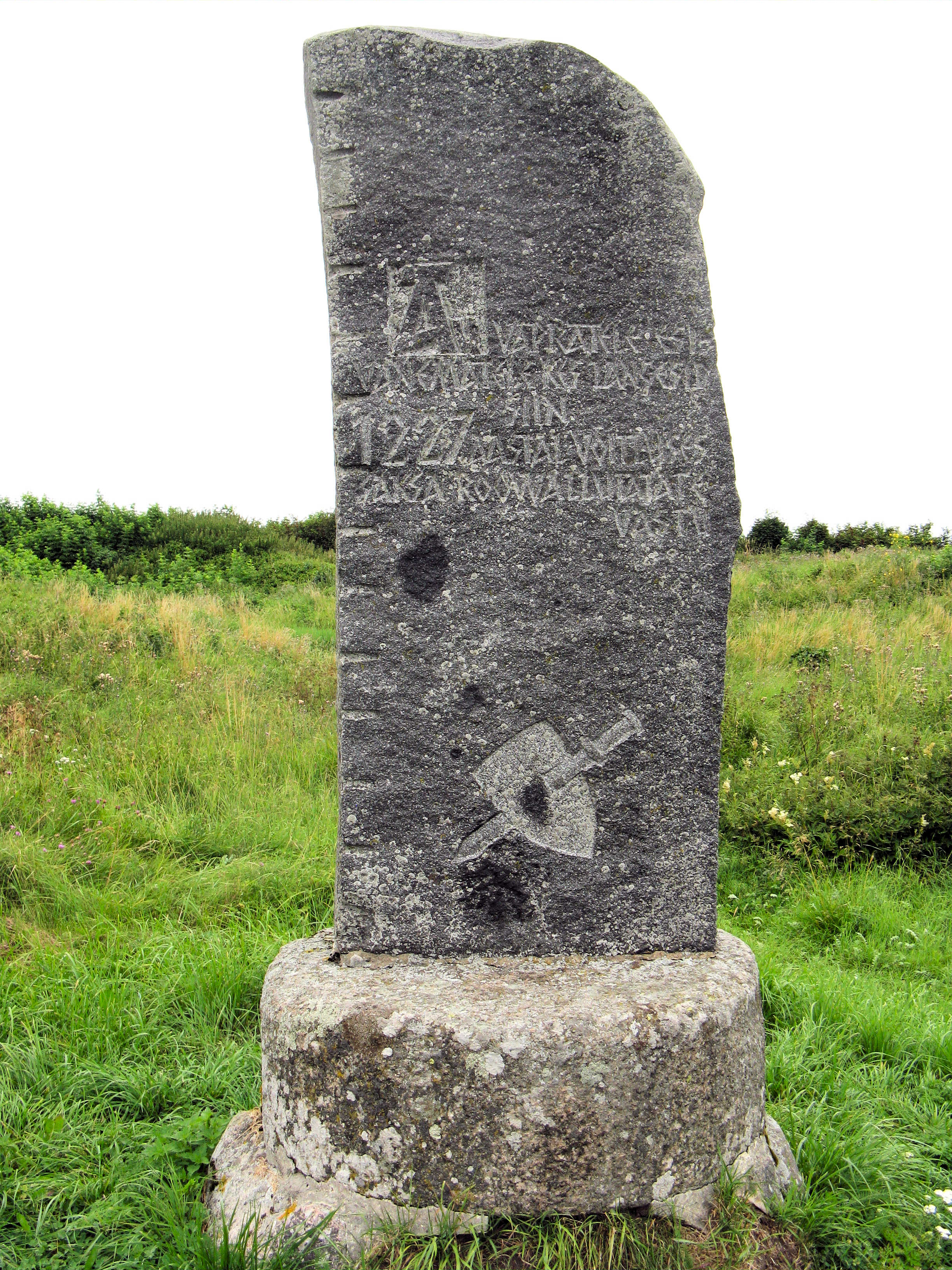
Monument in the center of the Muhu Stronghold

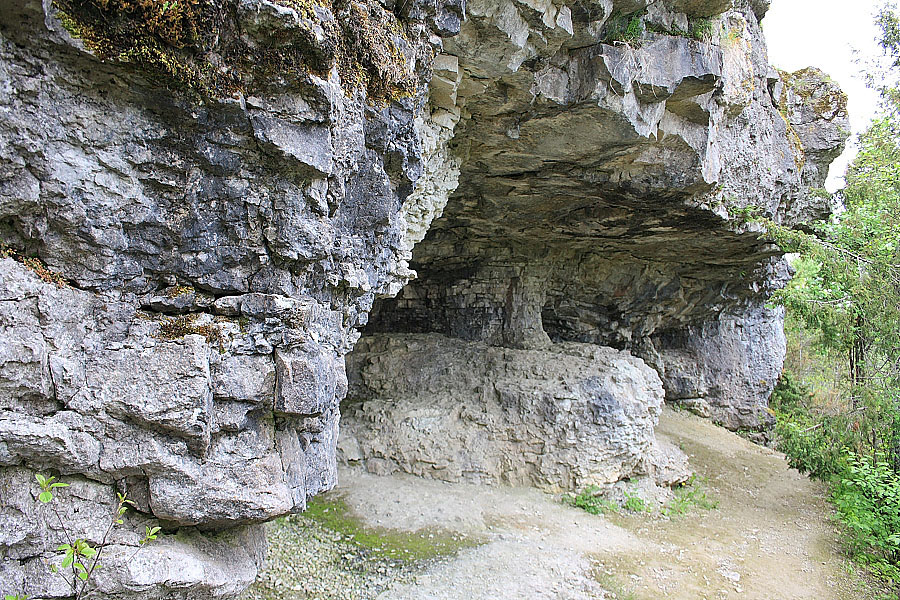
Üügu Nature Reserve

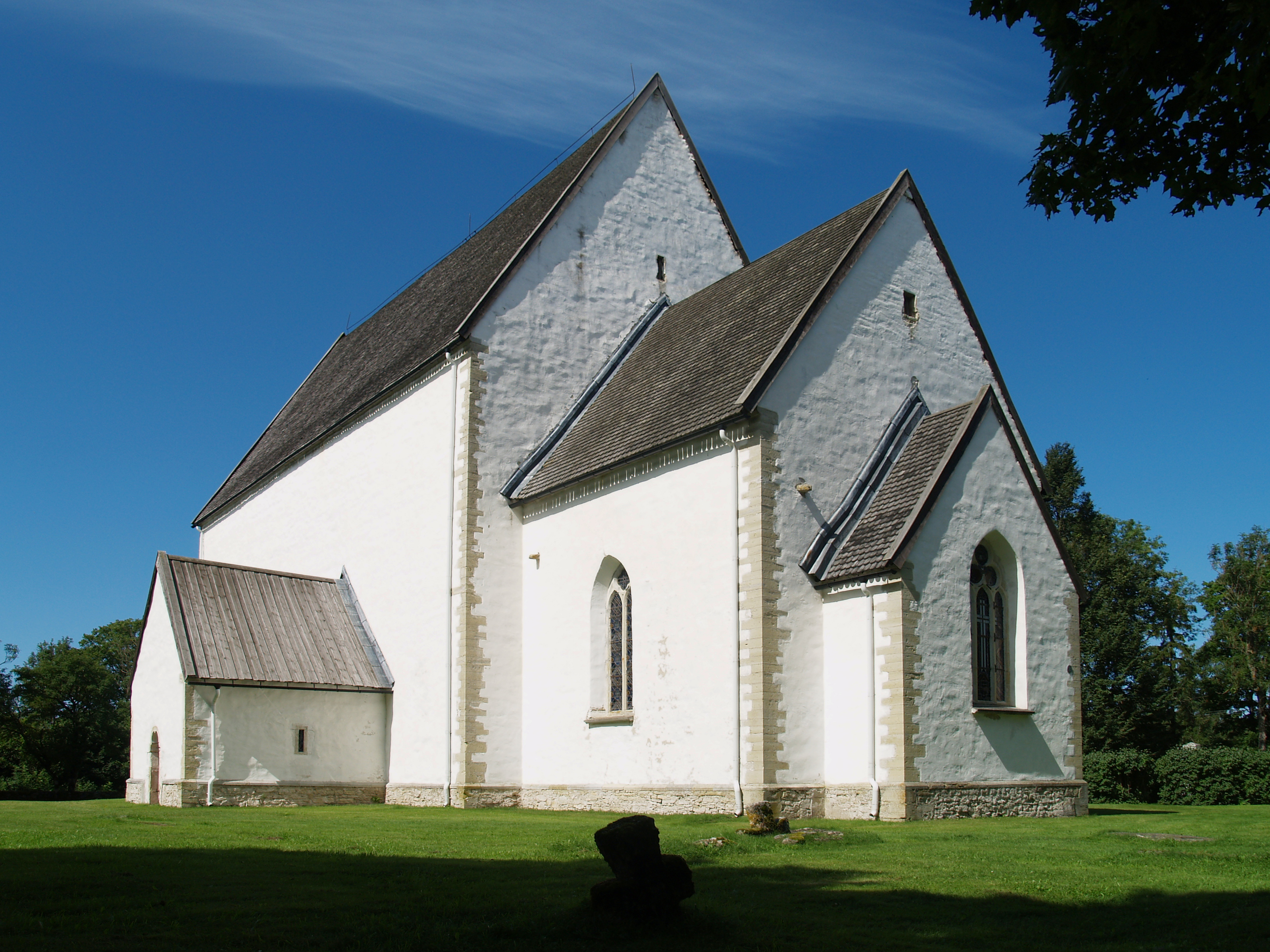
Muhu St. Catherine's Church

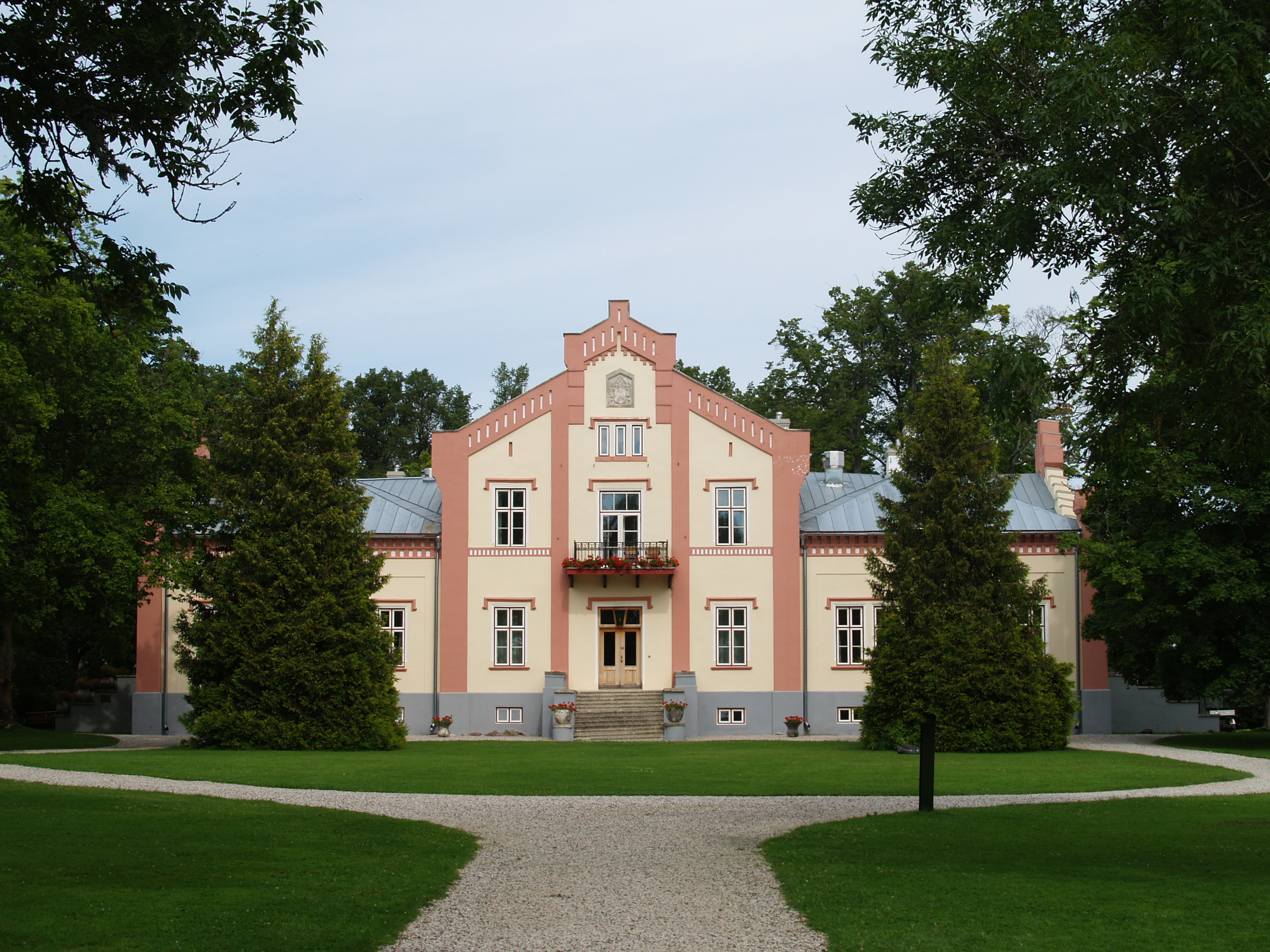
Pädaste Manor

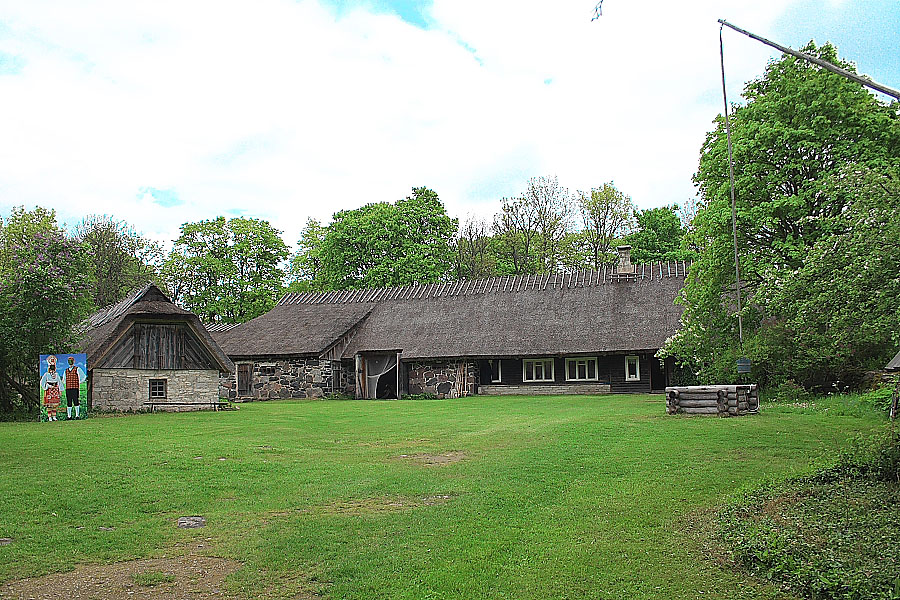
Tooma farm, part of Muhu museum and birthplace of writer Juhan Smuul

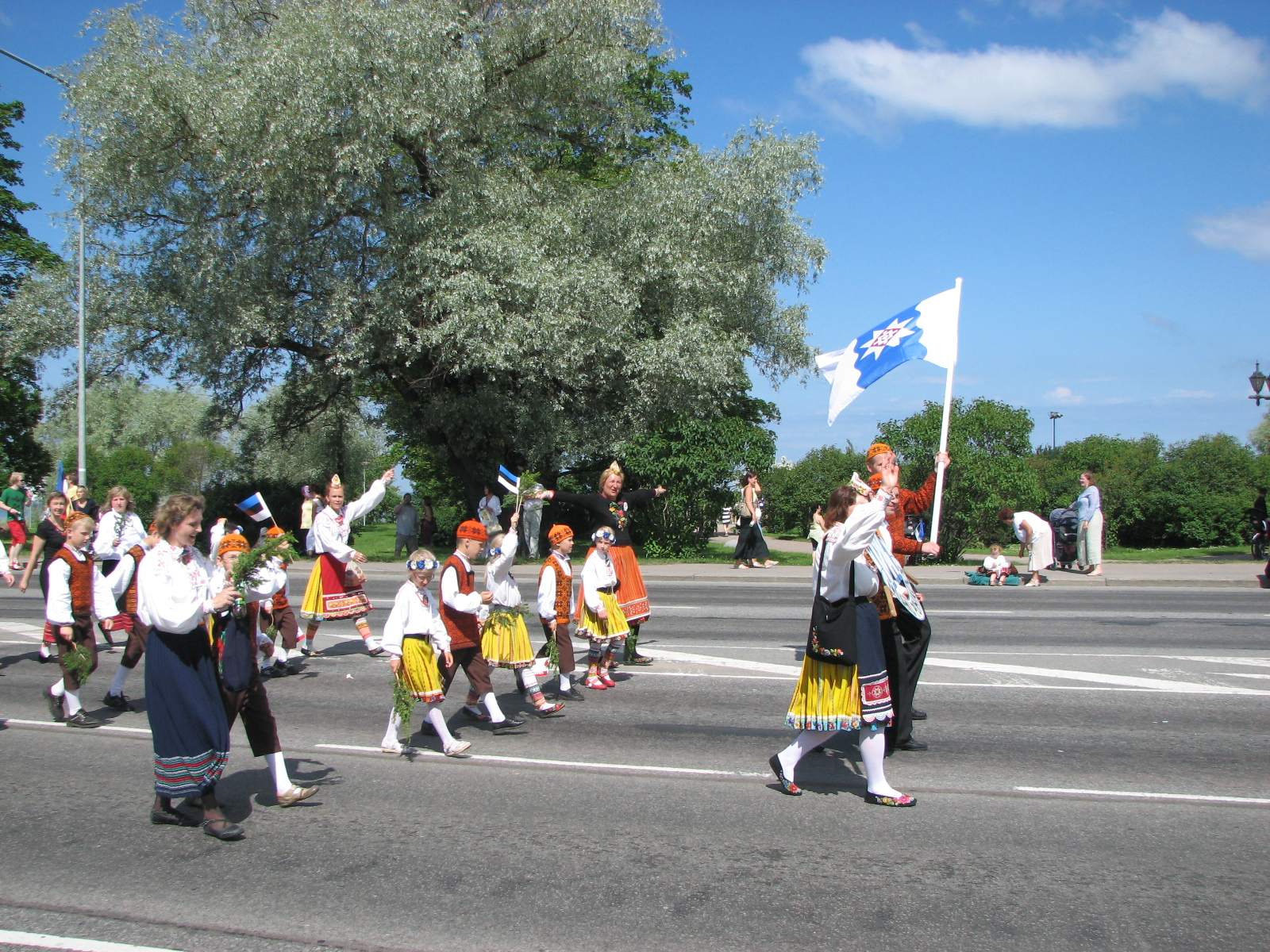
Students and teachers in traditional clothing march in a procession in Liiva

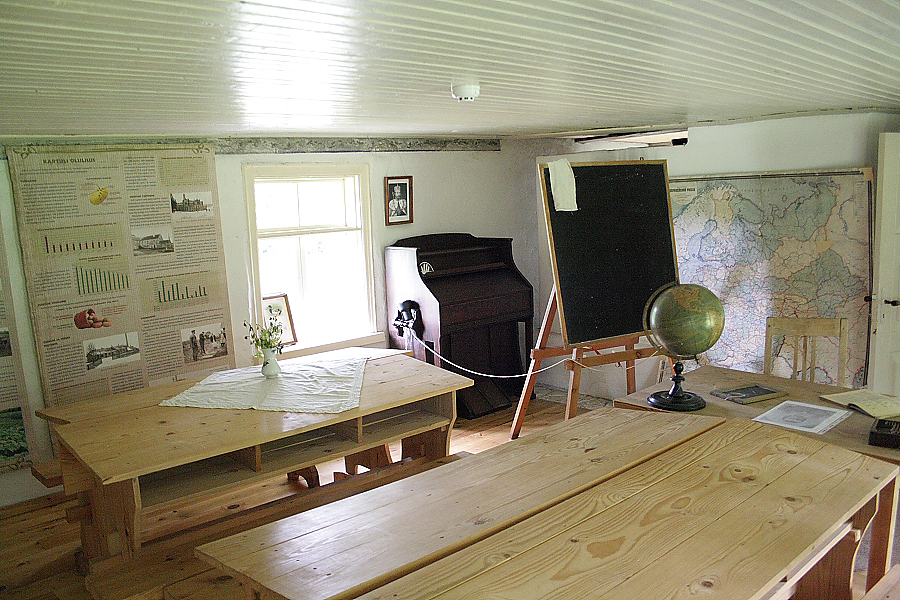
Old village school

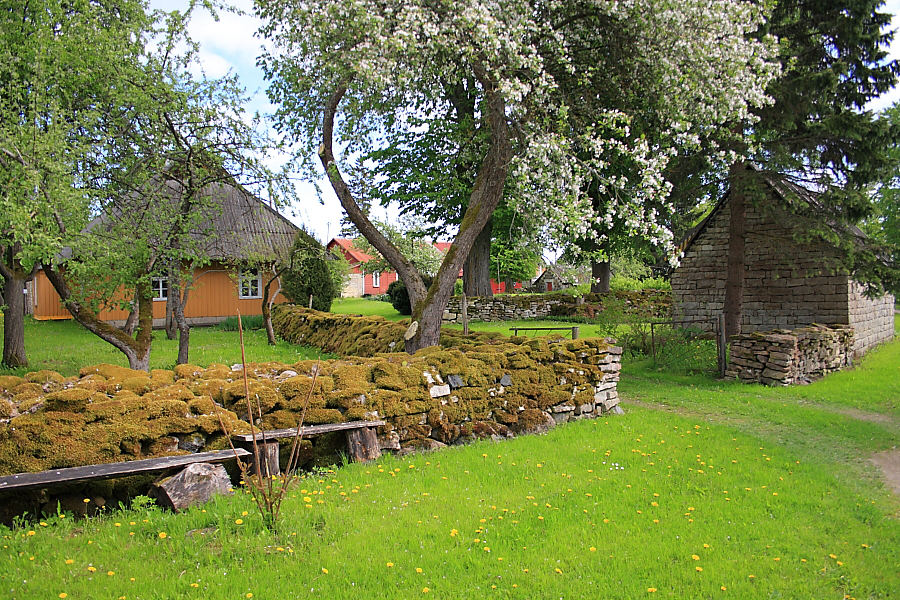
Mõega village

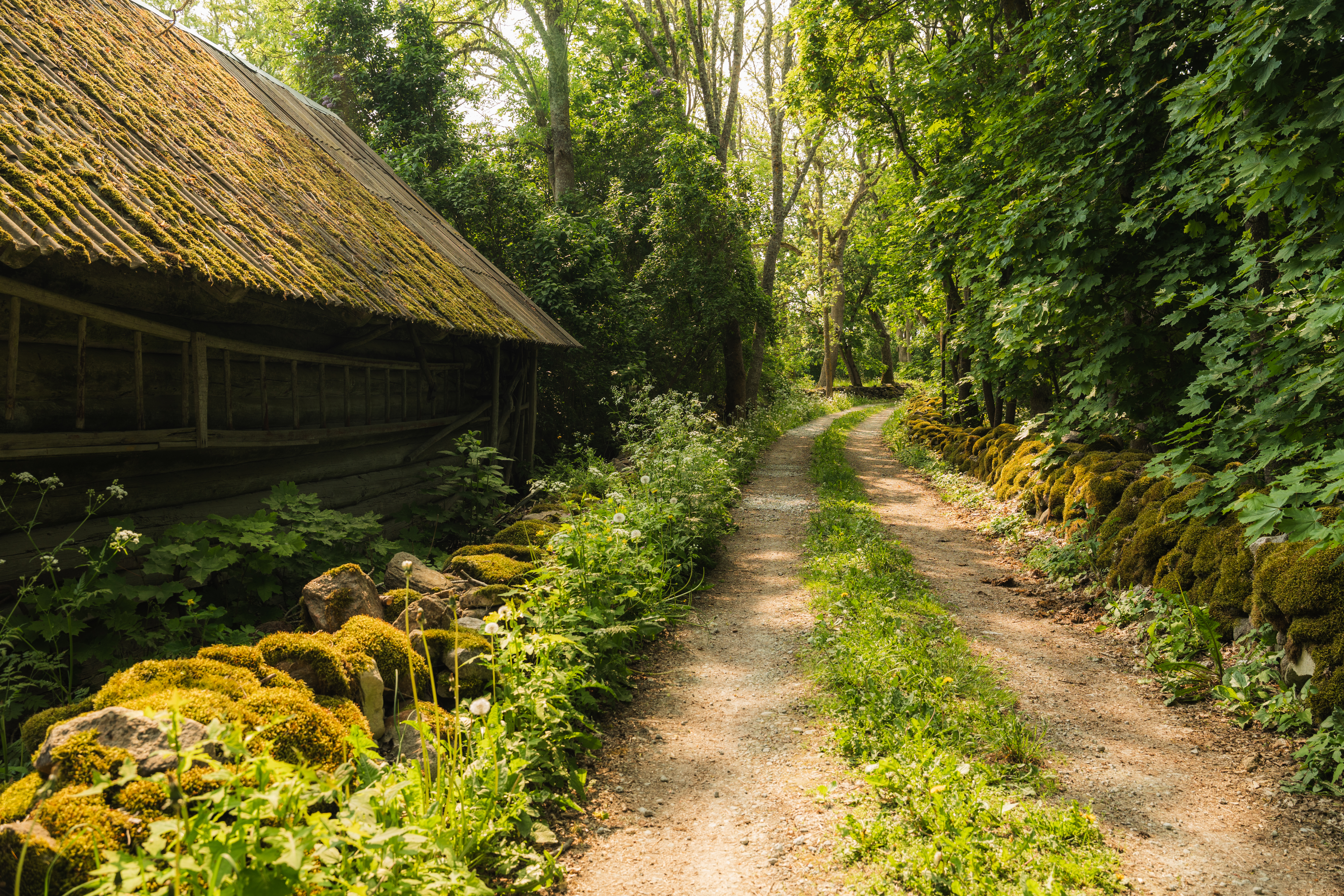
Dharma Resort, Rässa village

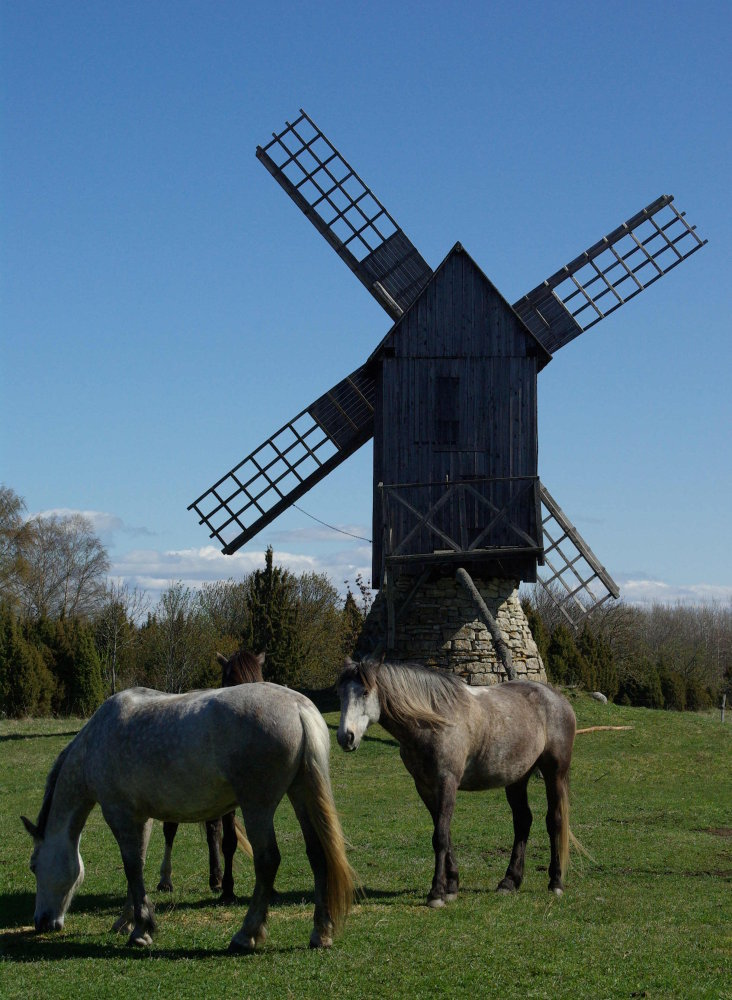
Windmill in Koguva

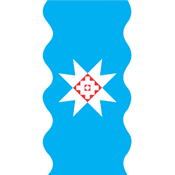
Flag of Muhu Parish

Coat of Arms of Muhu Parish

== See also ==
- Municipalities of Estonia
- List of municipalities of Estonia
- List of islands of Estonia
